= Gallimard (disambiguation) =

Éditions Gallimard is a leading French book publishing company.

Gallimard may also refer to:

- Gallimard Jeunesse, a French publisher of children's books, a subsidiary of Éditions Gallimard
- Découvertes Gallimard, an editorial collection published by Éditions Gallimard
- Gaston Gallimard (1881−1975), French book publisher
- Claude Gallimard (1914–1991), son of the former
- Simone Gallimard (1914–1995), wife of Claude
- Antoine Gallimard (born 1947) son of Claude and Simone
- Christian Gallimard, (born 1944), brother of Antoine and his sisters
- Isabelle Gallimard, sister
- Françoise Gallimard sister
