= Thibault de Montaigu =

French writer and journalist

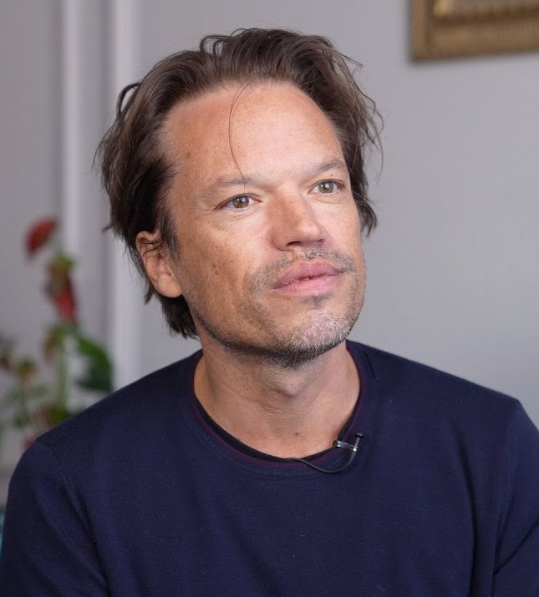
- In a 2024 interview
- Born: 21 December 1978 (age 47); Boulogne-Billancourt, France
- Education: lycée Henri-IV; Institut d'études politiques de Paris; Centre de formation des journalistes
- Occupations: writer; journalist; designer
- Spouse: Sofía Àchaval
- Children: 2
- Parent: Françoise Gallimard (mother)
- Relatives: Simone Gallimard (grandmother); Claude Gallimard (grandfather); Gaston Gallimard (great-grandfather)

Thibault Tassin de Montaigu (born 21 December 1978) is a French writer and journalist.

== Biography ==
Thibault de Montaigu was born on 21 December 1978 in Boulogne-Billancourt to Françoise Gallimard and Emmanuel Tassin de Montaigu. He is the maternal grandson of Simone Gallimard and Claude Gallimard. His maternal great-grandfather, Gaston Gallimard, was a founder of Nouvelle Revue Française and the founder of Éditions Gallimard. His father's family are members of the French nobility. After studying at lycée Henri-IV, de Montaigu entered Sciences Po then the Centre de formation des journalistes in Paris. He began his career at Libération in 2003 with the culture and guide services. Since then, he has collaborated on numerous publications (L'Officiel, Jalouse, l'Officiel Voyages, l'Optimum, Milk Magazine, Madame Figaro, Paris Match...).

He wrote five novels noticed by the critics which were selected in particular for the prix de Flore and the prix Interallié.

In 2011, he was curator of the exhibition "La Parisienne" at the Galerie des Galeries, which brought together many artists (Catherine Millet, Bertrand Burgalat, Stanislas Merhar, Valérie Mréjen, etc.) around the fictional apartment of a Parisienne.

He is married to designer and fashion stylist Sofía Àchaval, with whom he has two children.

== Works ==
- 2003: Les anges brûlent, éditions Fayard, ISBN 978-2213616384
- 2007: Un jeune homme triste, Fayard, ISBN 978-2213631899
- 2010: Les Grands Gestes la nuit, Fayard, ISBN 978-2213655345
- 2013: Zanzibar, Fayard, ISBN 978-2213672021
- 2015: Voyage autour de mon sexe, éditions Grasset and Fasquelle, ISBN 978-2246856849
