= Simone Gallimard =

French editor

- Born: Simone Cornu; 5 December 1917; Étampes, France
- Died: 22 October 1995 (aged 77); Neuilly-sur-Seine, France
- Occupation: Editor
- Spouse: Claude Gallimard
- Parent: André Cornu
- Family: Antoine; Christian; Isabelle; Françoise

Simone Gallimard (née Cornu; 5 December 1917 – 22 October 1995 ) was a French editor, leader of the Mercure de France.

== Career ==
Gallimard was the daughter of André Cornu, a politician and a senior French official who was a senator, deputy before the war and secretary of state for fine arts in different governments, between 1951 and 1954. In 1939, she married Claude Gallimard, son of Gaston Gallimard, founder and boss of the publishing house Gallimard. The four children of this marriage were Francoise, Christian, Antoine and Isabelle, all working in the book trade.

After the purchase in 1957 by his father-in-law Gaston Gallimard of Mercure de France, a publishing house founded in 1894 by Alfred Vallette, Simone Gallimard became its director in 1962 and CEO in 1969. She was surrounded by renown literary directors such as Renaud Matignon, Michel Cournot, Paul Pavlowitch, Nicolas Bréhal. Authors of this publishing house received enviable literary prizes: prix Goncourt for Andreï Makine, prix Renaudot for Salvat Etchart, prix Médicis for Michel Butel and François-Olivier Rousseau, prix Femina for Claude Faraggi, Jocelyne François and Paula Jacques.

She was at the heart of the "Émile Ajar affair": Ajar was awarded the prix Goncourt, when he was in fact the pseudonym of Romain Gary, who still remains the only recipient of two Goncourt awards.

She died on 23 October 1995 as a result of cancer. Her daughter, Isabelle, succeeded her as the head of the Mercury of France in 1995.
