= Christian Gallimard =

French publisher and business owner

- Born: 16 September 1944 (age 80); Paris
- Occupation(s): Publisher, Business executive
- Parent(s): Claude Gallimard (father); Simone Gallimard (mother); Gaston Gallimard (grandfather)
- Family: Antoine Gallimard (brother); Isabelle Gallimard (sister); Françoise Gallimard (sister)

Christian Gallimard (born 16 September 1944) is a French publisher and entrepreneur based in Geneva.

== Biography ==
The son of Claude Gallimard, he founded the éditions Calligram in 1992 at Geneva, which publish the Max et Lili series among others.

He was previously closely associated with the development of Éditions Gallimard. Under the presidency of his grandfather Gaston Gallimard and later that of his father Claude, he encouraged the autonomy of the house by separating it from the diffusion Hachette and co-editions such as Le Livre de Poche, which gave rise to the Folio collection, or L'Univers des formes and the Bibliothèque de la Pléiade, which remained at Gallimard.

He was at the origin, in 1971, of the independent distribution logistics tool, Sodis, and of commercial distribution tools such as the CDE and the EDF, and the recruitment of Pierre Marchand who developed the youth and leisure sectors (sailing books and guides) with remarkable success.

Always on the lookout for technological evolutions, his interest for foresight earned him sometimes difficult relationships with the very literary collaborators of the house, including his father Claude, who asked him to leave the Gallimard group in 1984.

In 1990, he sold, along with his sister Françoise Gallimard, his shares in the group, which led Antoine Gallimard to create the Groupe Madrigall in 1992.
