= Pierre Sipriot =

French journalist (1921–1998)

Pierre Sipriot (French: [pjɛʁ sipʁjo]; 16 January 1921 in Paris – 13 December 1998 in Fontenay-lès-Briis) was a 20th-century French journalist and principal biographer of Henry de Montherlant.

A journalist for the national radio station France Culture, Pierre Sipriot started working in radio in 1944 and produced the Les Lundis de l'Histoire radio program from 1966. He produced thousands of hours of cultural programming. He interviewed the major writers of his day, among them de Montherlant, to whom he was a friend and advisor for twenty-five years. He also interviewed Thomas Mann, Nikos Kazantzakis, André Breton, and Jean Cocteau, among others. The series "Spectral Analysis of the West" (1958–1968) was the first themed cultural radio program. From 1965 to 1990, every day on France-Culture, in the show called "Un livre, des voix," he introduced listeners to a new novel.

He was the editor of Les Cahiers du Rocher. A journalist from 1974 to 1987, he served as head of the literary news desk at Le Figaro. He was twice a recipient of prizes awarded by the Académie française: the Prix Broquette-Gonin in 1973 and the Prix de la critique in 1977.

== Works ==
- 1953: Montherlant par lui-même, Le Seuil
- 1982: Montherlant sans masque Tome I, L'Enfant prodigue, Robert Laffont
- 1990: Montherlant sans masque Tome II, Écris avec ton sang
- 1979: Montherlant Dessins, preface by Pierre Sipriot, Copernic
- 1983: Henry de Montherlant - Roger Peyrefitte, Correspondance (1938–1941), presentation and notes by R. Peyrefitte and Pierre Sipriot, Robert Laffont
- 1979: Album de la Pléiade: Montherlant, bibliothèque de la Pléiade, éditions Gallimard
- 1987: Pierre Sipriot (dir.), Brasillach et la génération perdue, Éditions du Rocher, Hommage collectif (Jean Anouilh, Maurice Bardèche, Jean Guitton, Fred Kupferman, Anne Brassié, Dominique Desanti, Thierry Maulnier and Jean-Marc Varaut).
- 1988: Montherlant et le suicide, Éditions du Rocher
- 1997: Guerre et paix autour de Romain Rolland: Le désastre de l'Europe, 1914-1918, Bartillat

== Bibliography ==
- "Le procès du Montherlant sans masque de Pierre Sipriot", Droit et Littérature, double issue of the review ACTES, n° 43-44, April 1984, presented and edited by Régine Dhoquois and Annie Prassoloff.
