= Renaud Matignon =

French journalist and writer

Renaud Matignon (1936 in Metz – 6 February 1998 in Paris) was a 20th-century French journalist and writer who worked particularly with Le Figaro and the Figaro littéraire.

== Career ==
Renaud Matignon made his debut in the press at the cultural weekly Arts (launched by Georges Wildenstein, directed by André Parinaud) in 1954. He later worked for Candide, la Nouvelle Revue française, Le Figaro and Le Figaro littéraire.

Along Philippe Sollers, Jean-René Huguenin and Jean-Edern Hallier, he launched the magazine Tel Quel which he quickly left.

From 1964 to 1974, Renaud Matignon was the literary director of Mercure de France (directed by Simone Gallimard).

He did not publish any books during his lifetime. The collection of his articles of Le Figaro littéraire, La liberté de blâmer (preface by Jacques Laurent, of the Académie française, allows to taste samples of his sharp style and some of his vachard finds... Examples : Jean-Louis Bory : "This Spartacus of the Codpiece"; Régis Debray: "To every lord all honor: Mr. Debray begins by himself"; Max Gallo: "The Malraux of the campsites" ...

== Bibliography ==
- 1998: La Liberté de blâmer... (preface by Jacques Laurent, of the Académie française), édit. Bartillat, ISBN 978-2841005512
