= Françoise Gallimard =

French publisher

- Born: Paris
- Occupation: Publisher
- Parents: Claude Gallimard (father); Simone Gallimard (mother)
- Family: Christian Gallimard (brother); Antoine (brother); Isabelle Gallimard (sister)

Françoise Gallimard, born in Paris, is a French business woman.

== Biography ==
The daughter of Claude Gallimard, who was president of the publishing house Éditions Gallimard (from 1976 to 1988), and Simone Gallimard, who headed the Mercure de France, Françoise Gallimard resold in 1990, along with her brother Christian Gallimard, the shares she held in the publishing group then led by her brother Antoine Gallimard: the case was settled in 1992 with the creation of the Groupe Madrigall.

In 1997, she created, together with the UNESCO, the Prix UNESCO-Françoise Gallimard for the promotion of French-language literature. This prize, awarded every April 23, is endowed with $15,000, Françoise Gallimard funding the organization of this prize to the tune of $50,000 a year.

She is the mother of writer and journalist Thibault de Montaigu.
