= Album de la Pléiade =

French book series

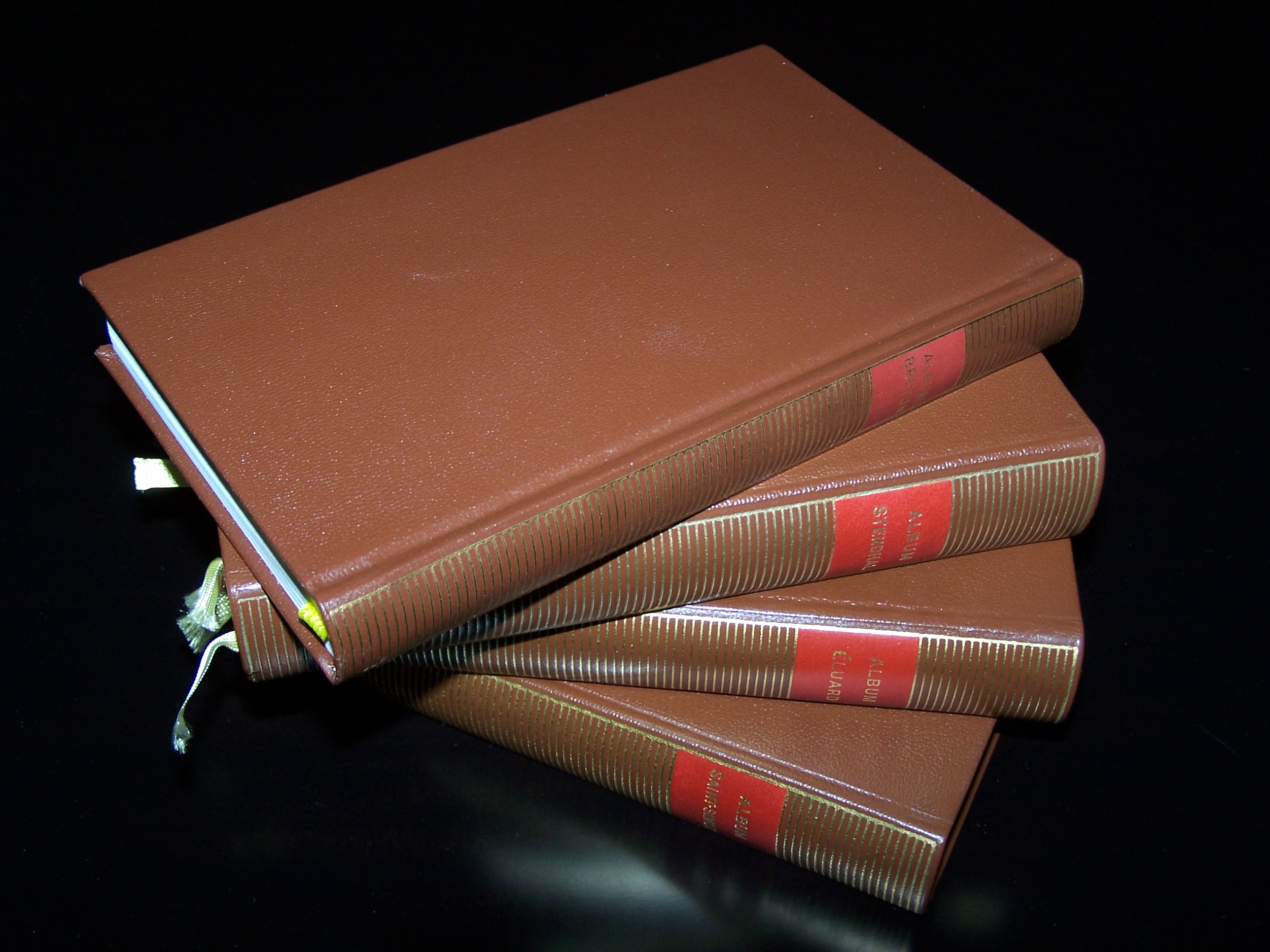
Some of the albums (Breton, Stendhal, Éluard, Saint-Simon).

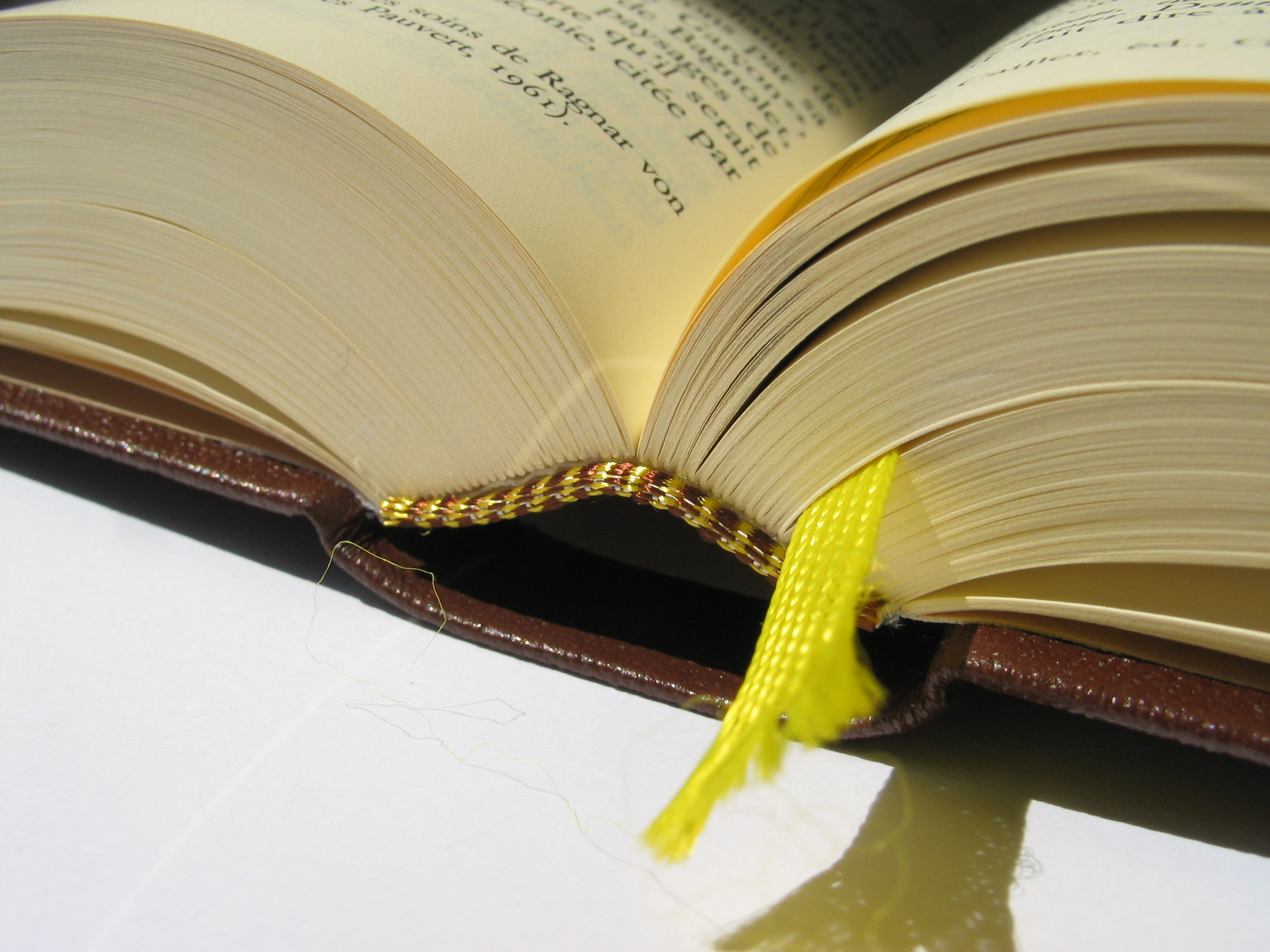
Detailed view of the binding of a volume in the Bibliothèque de la Pléiade.

The Album de la Pléiade is a book published every year in May by the "Bibliothèque de la Pléiade", a series of classic French and international texts by French publishing house éditions Gallimard. It is usually about an author published in the series, although occasionally about a collective from a specific time period (1961 recording and 1989 album) or an important topic of the collection (1970 and 2009 albums).

Featured authors are generally chosen upon their entry in the series or a major addition of their works.

Each album is richly illustrated and focuses on iconography, with an accompanying bibliographical text by a renowned specialist of the selected author. It is produced in the same format, leather-bound cover and gold lettering as volumes of the Bibliothèque de la Pléiade, but has generally fewer pages and is printed on thicker paper to allow the inclusion of many colour images.

The Albums are not for sale. They are offered by the booksellers to customers who purchase three books from the collection. They tend to be distributed very quickly and immediately become collector's items. Because of this, the most popular books of the collection such as, among others, Album Proust (1965), Album Céline (1977) or Album Balzac (1962) can only be obtained on reselling markets at high prices (often found around $200–$300). The older (1960s-1970s) books are also often high priced due to their rarity, even if the author is less popular. The oldest, Dictionnaire des auteurs de la Pléiade (Dictionary of the Authors of the Pléiade), published in 1960 has always been the most expensive, selling for over $400–$450.

== List of the albums ==
- 1960: Dictionnaire des auteurs de la Pléiade, a dictionary considered as the forerunner to the albums.
- 1961: Poètes du XVIe siècle, an LP record of poems by 16th-century poets read by renowned actors such as María Casares, with an appended booklet in Pléiade format containing all featured poems.
1. 1962: Honoré de Balzac
2. 1963: Émile Zola
3. 1964: Victor Hugo
4. 1965: Marcel Proust
5. 1966: Stendhal
6. 1967: Arthur Rimbaud
7. 1968: Paul Éluard
8. 1969: Saint-Simon
9. 1970: Classical theater
10. 1971: Guillaume Apollinaire
11. 1972: Gustave Flaubert (1st)
12. 1973: George Sand
13. 1974: Charles Baudelaire (1st)
14. 1975: Fyodor Dostoevsky
15. 1976: Jean-Jacques Rousseau
16. 1977: Louis-Ferdinand Céline (1st)
17. 1978: Blaise Pascal
18. 1979: Henry de Montherlant
19. 1980: Jean Giono
20. 1981: Paul Verlaine
21. 1982: Albert Camus
22. 1983: Voltaire
23. 1984: Colette
24. 1985: André Gide
25. 1986: André Malraux
26. 1987: Guy de Maupassant
27. 1988: François-René de Chateaubriand
28. 1989: “The Writers of the French Revolution”
29. 1990: Lewis Carroll
30. 1991: Jean-Paul Sartre
31. 1992: Jacques Prévert
32. 1993: Gérard de Nerval
33. 1994: Antoine de Saint-Exupéry
34. 1995: William Faulkner
35. 1996: Oscar Wilde
36. 1997: Louis Aragon
37. 1998: Julien Green
38. 1999: Jorge Luis Borges
39. 2000: the NRF
40. 2001: Marcel Aymé
41. 2002: Raymond Queneau
42. 2003: Georges Simenon
43. 2004: Denis Diderot
44. 2005: One Thousand and One Nights
45. 2006: Jean Cocteau
46. 2007: Michel de Montaigne
47. 2008: André Breton
48. 2009: the Holy Grail
49. 2010: Molière
50. 2011: Paul Claudel
51. 2012: Jules Verne
52. 2013: Blaise Cendrars
53. 2014: Marguerite Duras
54. 2015: Giacomo Casanova
55. 2016: William Shakespeare
56. 2017: Georges Perec
57. 2018: Simone de Beauvoir
58. 2019: Romain Gary
59. 2020: Joseph Kessel
60. 2021: Gustave Flaubert (2nd)
61. 2022: Franz Kafka
62. 2023: Louis-Ferdinand Céline (2nd)
63. 2024: Charles Baudelaire (2nd)
64. 2025: Sherlock Holmes
