= Paul Pavlowitch =

French writer

Paul Pavlowitch (born February 5, 1942) is a French writer, editor and journalist. He trained as a lawyer and has worked in various jobs, including as a teacher, librarian, and translator. A relative of the well-known French author, Romain Gary, Pavlowitch was presented in public through the 1970s in the guise of writer "Emile Ajar", actually a pseudonym of Gary's. Assuming this role for his famous cousin—concealing the true authorship of certain novels of Gary's—embroiled Pavlowitch in controversy when the deception came to light. Pavlowitch's first published work was his 1981 account of the affair, L'homme que l'on croyait ('The man we believed'). Pavlowitch went on to write novels, having his first published in 1986. Since 2000, he has had four further novels published.

== Background and education ==
Pavlowitch was born in Nice, to a mother from a Lithuanian–Jewish background.

A scholarship enabled Pavlowitch to study law in Toulouse and Paris; he graduated in 1964. After obtaining his license in legal practice, a stay in an American university was financed by Gary, who considered him something like a son. After having been a librarian at the Lycée Arago in Paris, Pavlowitch became a "copyist", then an English translator for various publishing houses, and an editor at the Mercure de France, a publishing house run by Simone Gallimard.

== The Emile Ajar affair ==
Although the writer Romain Gary presented Paul Pavlowitch as his "nephew", Pavlowitch is the son of Gary's first cousin, Dinah Owczyńska. This means to each other they were cousins also, just "at one remove". That is, the precise relationship between them is that Paul is Romain Gary's first cousin, once removed, in French: cousin germain au 1er degré éloigné.

Pavlowitch is famous for having assumed, in the early 1970s, the pseudonymic identity of "Émile Ajar", at the request of Romain Gary, who wanted an alternative identity to write under; Pavlowitch thus played for eight years the author of the novels Gros-Câlin, La Vie devant soi, Pseudo and L'Angoisse du roi Salomon, actually written by his "uncle". Émile Ajar won the Prix Goncourt in 1975, a prize not awarded to a single author more than once. Gary ultimately was not refused the award and remains the only writer to receive this prize on two occasions. Gradually, journalists established the relationship between Romain Gary and "Ajar"–Pavlowitch. Gary then invents, mischievously, a fictional confession to the Ajar ruse. The result is Pseudo (1976), a novel featuring a mysterious, tyrannical, egocentric uncle named Tonton Macoute, in which everyone can recognize Gary. Violent and comical, this novel analyzes the intricacies of literary creation.

The links between Paul Pavlowitch, who got caught up in the writer's game, and Romain Gary (who signed a contract with Mercure de France for five books by Ajar) were deteriorating. The latter calls on his lawyer to formalize an arrangement: forty percent of his royalties go to Pavlowitch who, in exchange, guarantees the secrecy of the agreement, and signs several letters to Romain attesting that he is only "a puppet".

In 1981, shortly after the death of Romain Gary on December 2, 1980, Pavlowitch published a book under his own name, L'Homme que l'on croyait, where he gave his version of the adventure. On June 30, 1981, as a prelude to the release of this memoir, he had the true identity of Ajar publicized, in an AFP press release. On July 3, 1981, he was invited onto the literary program Apostrophes by Bernard Pivot. A short text by Romain Gary intended for posthumous release, Vie et mort d'Émile Ajar (dated March 21, 1979), was hurriedly published on July 17.

A documentary directed by Philippe Kohly for French television (Le Roman du double), broadcast in 2010, is a sympathetic presentation of the unusual story of le phénomène Ajar, which in its time aroused the hostility of a number of journalists and literary critics.

== Later life and family ==
In the 1980s and 1990s, Pavlowitch worked for L'Autre Journal, the political and literary magazine founded by Michel Butel. He also teaches classes to prisoners.

He is the father of two daughters, Anna, president of Flammarion and Éditions Albin Michel, and Julia, director of Éditions Phébus and Libretto.

== Published works ==
=== Novels ===
- La peau de l'ours [The skin of the bear, or, Bear skin]. Paris: Mazarine. 1986. ISBN 978-2863742242. Publisher's information page for novel.
- Victor: récit (in French). Paris: Fayard. 2000. ISBN 978-2213602684.
- Céline: Enfance (in French). Vol. 1. Paris: Fayard. 2001. ISBN 978-2213608716. Tome 1.
- Un autre monde [Another world]. Paris: Fayard. 2004. ISBN 978-2213618210.
- Tom: Roman [Tom: A novel]. Paris: Ramsay. 2005. ISBN 978-2841147274.

=== Memoir ===
- L'homme que l'on croyait. Paris: Fayard. 1981. ISBN 978-2213010601.
