= Jacques Schiffrin =

French publisher (1892–1950)

Jacques Schiffrin (28 March 1892, Baku – 17 November 1950, New York City) was an editor and French translator, famous for the creation of Bibliothèque de la Pléiade in 1923 which was integrated with Gallimard in 1933.

== Biography ==
Jacques Schiffrin came from a non-practicing Jewish family in Baku. Having graduated in law from the University of Geneva, he moved to Paris in 1922 after the Russian Revolution of 1917 which made him flee to Monte Carlo.

=== Editor ===
Passionate about literature, in 1923 he set up a publishing firm, Editions de la Pléiade /J. Schiffrin & Co., located at 6 rue Tournefort, Paris. In November 1925, he founded with Joseph Poutermann, his brother-in-law, and Alexandre Halpern, the Société des Amis de la Pléiade (English, "society of the friends of the Pleiade"). In 1931, he launched a luxury edition of the great French and foreign authors, the Bibliothèque reliée de la Pléiade in which appeared a dozen volumes including the works of Baudelaire, Racine, Voltaire, Edgar Allan Poe, Laclos, Musset and Stendhal.

He befriended many great writers of this period and especially with Andre Gide, with whom he undertook a translation into French of the novels of Pushkin, and with whom he became a close friend and corresponded for a period of thirty years. It was André Gide who urged Gaston Gallimard, the owner of the NRF editions, to integrate the Bibliothèque de la Pléiade (English, "library of the Pleiade") into the Gallimard publishing firm, something that was carried out on 31 July 1933. Schiffrin then became the first director of this book series.

Naturalized French in 1937, Schiffrin was mobilized in 1939 into the French army.

On 5 November 1940, following anti-Jewish laws designed to remove Jews from positions of economic and intellectual influence, he was dismissed by Gaston Gallimard and went to take refuge in the United States with his family in 1941, via Marseille, Casablanca and Lisbon with the financial assistance of André Gide.

He moved to New York to continue his publishing profession by founding the Pantheon Books editions with the German publisher couple Helen and Kurt Wolff. He never returned to France and died in New York from a respiratory illness.

=== The translator ===
Jacques Schiffrin translated Russian authors (Turgenev, Pushkin, Gogol, Dostoevsky) into French, which were published in 1929 by his first publishing house, and, after the war, by the French Book Club.

== Personal life ==
Jacques Schiffrin is the brother of film producer Simon Schiffrin.

He was married, from 1921 to 1927, to the French pianist Youra Guller, before her departure for Shanghai. He remarried Simone Heymann with whom he had two children, including André Schiffrin born in 1935.
