= Bibliothèque de la Pléiade =

French editorial collection

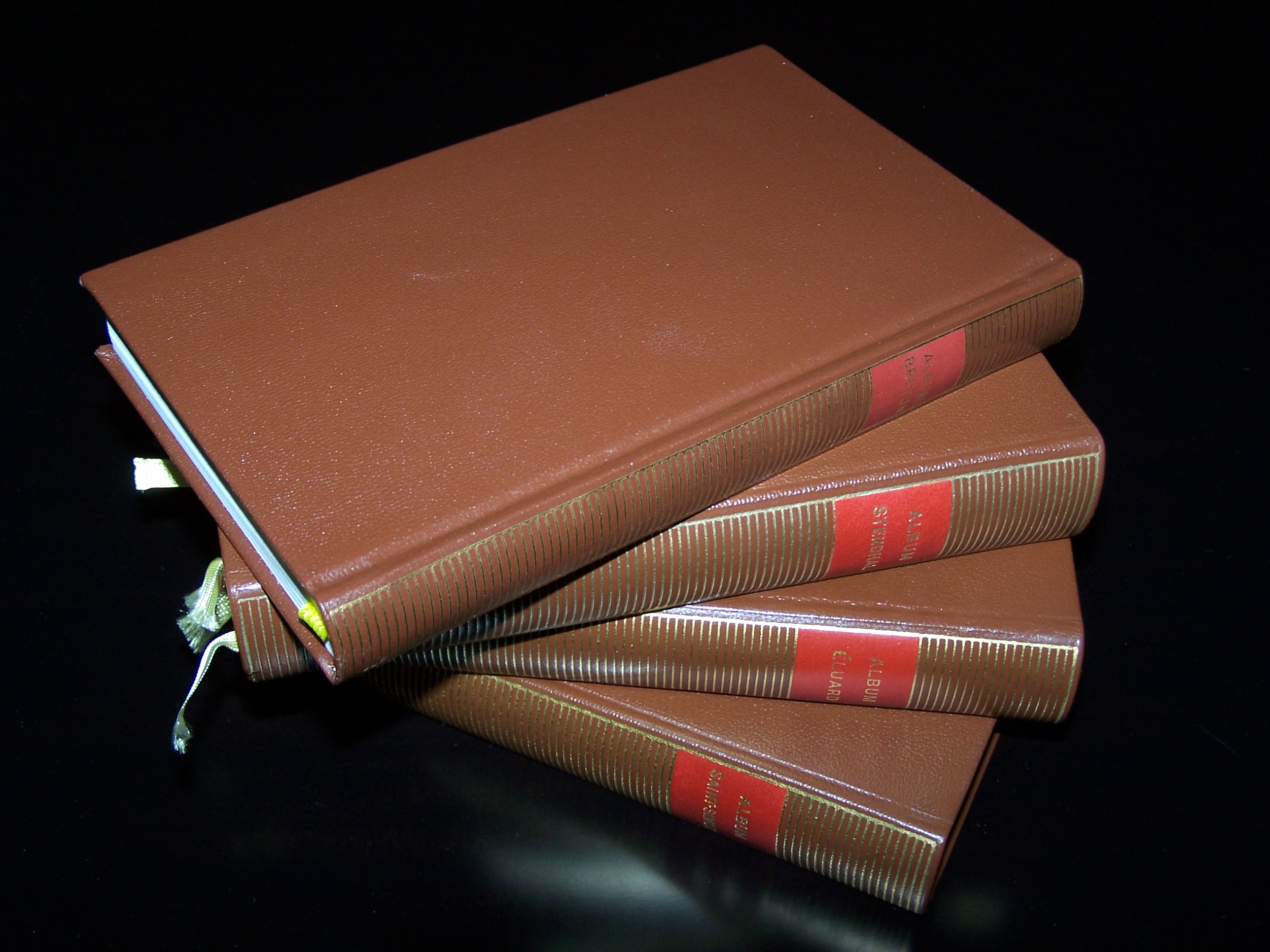
- Some albums de la Pléiade
- Parent company: Éditions Gallimard
- Founded: 1931
- Founder: Jacques Schiffrin
- Country of origin: France
- Headquarters location: Paris
- Publication types: Books
- Official website: www.la-pleiade.fr

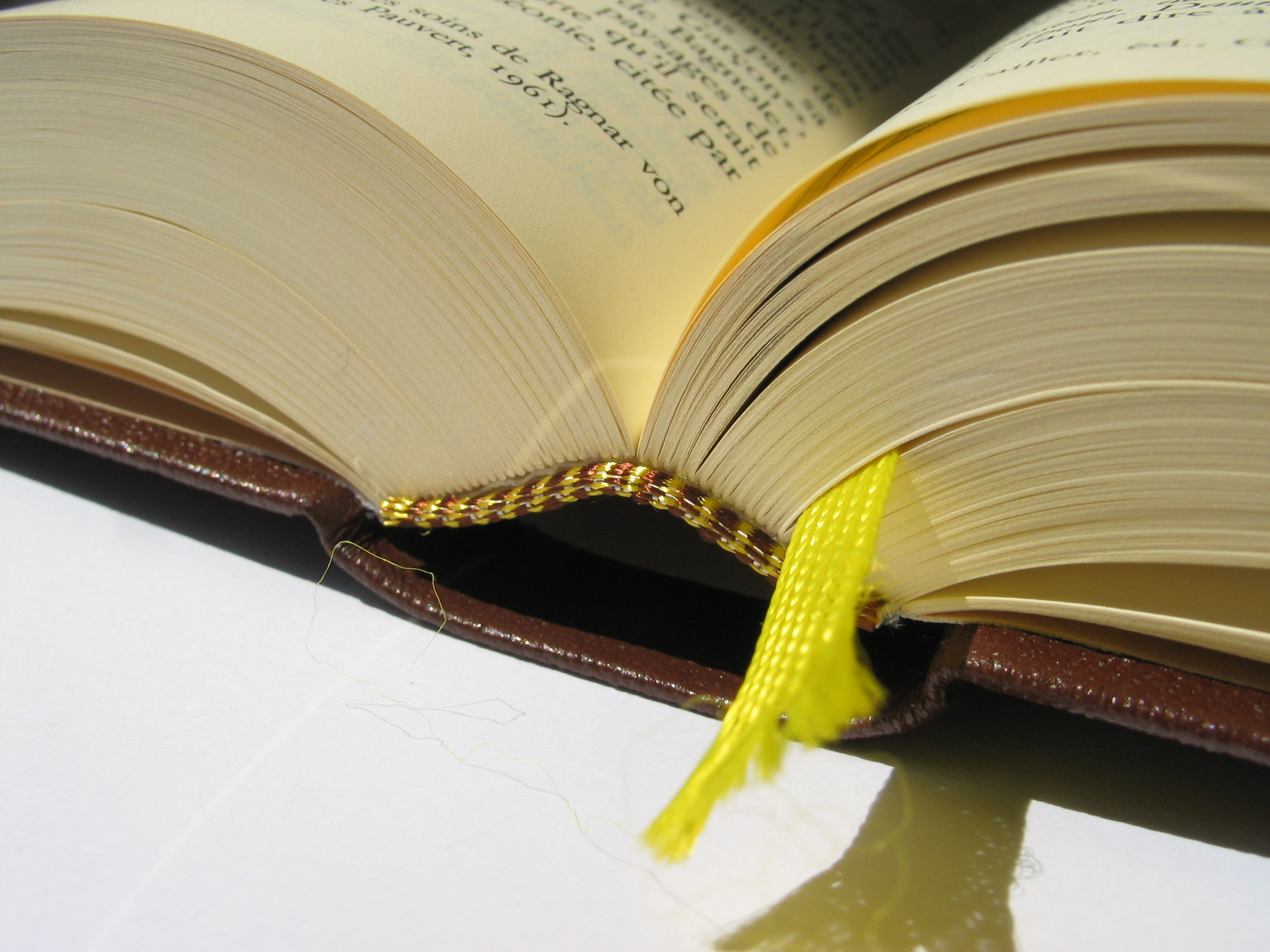
Detailed view of the fine binding of a volume in the Bibliothèque de la Pléiade

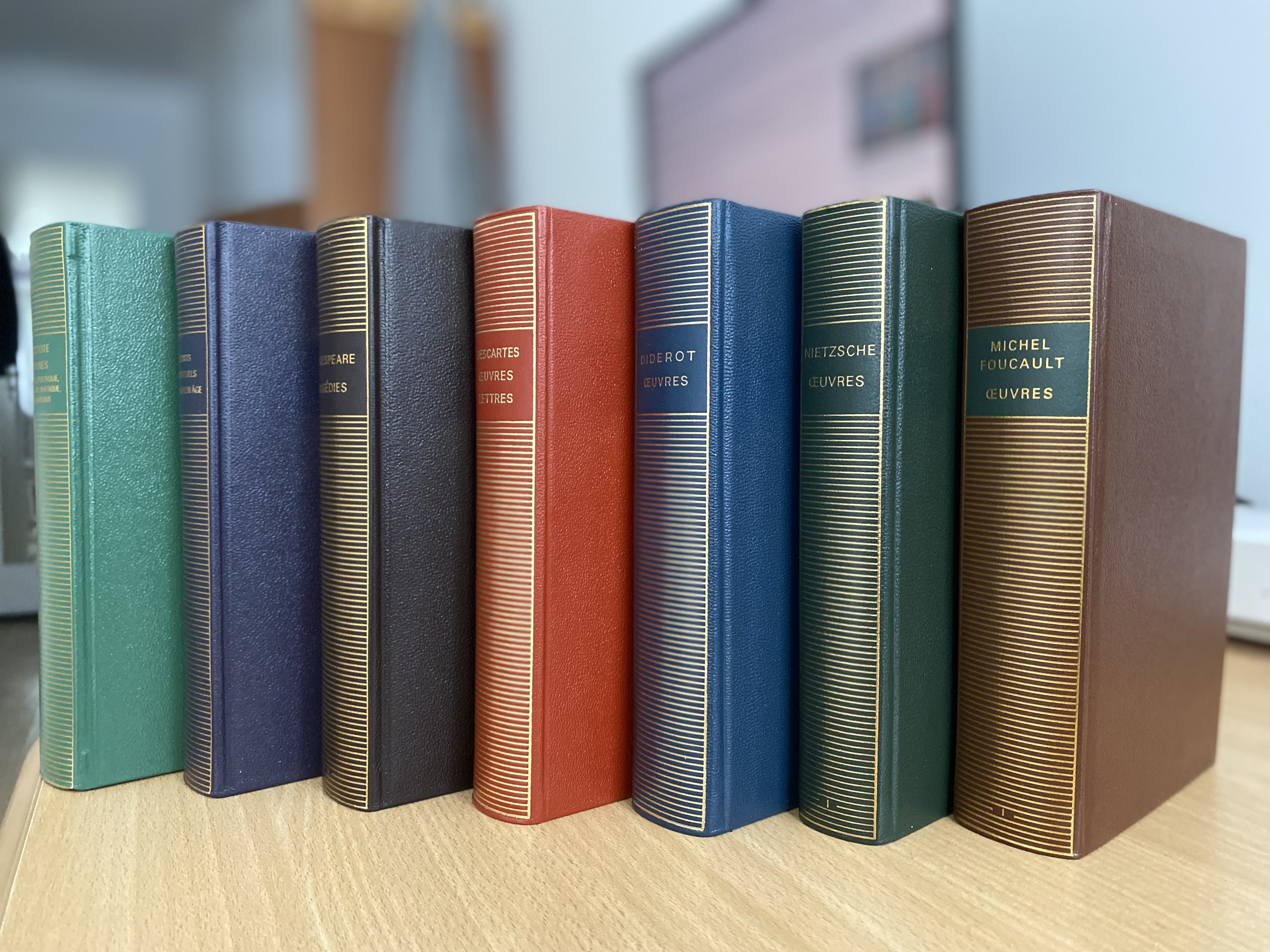
Seven books in the Pléiade collection in the seven colors available, according to periods.

The Bibliothèque de la Pléiade ([bi.bli.jɔ.tɛk də la ple.jad], "Pleiades Library") is a French editorial collection which was created in 1931 by Jacques Schiffrin, an independent young editor. Schiffrin wanted to provide the public with reference editions of the complete works of classic authors in a pocket format. André Gide took an interest in Schiffrin's project and brought it into Gallimard, under which imprint it is still published.

The Pléiade has a strong emphasis on works that were originally written in French, though the collection also includes classics of world literature, such as bilingual editions of the works of William Shakespeare, or French editions of Jane Austen's work. To date, more than eight hundred books have been published in the series, with eleven books generally published every year. The "entry into the Pléiade" is considered a major sign of recognition for an author in France, and it is extremely rare that a living author is published in the Pléiade.

In 1992, Gallimard and Einaudi began a similar series of literature in Italian, the Biblioteca della Pléiade. The Library of America series, launched in 1979, is a similar project in the United States inspired by the Bibliothèque de la Pléiade.

== History ==
The Bibliothèque de la Pléiade was founded by Jacques Schiffrin in 1931. The first volume published was the first tome of the complete works of Charles Baudelaire, on 10 September 1931. André Gide and Jean Schlumberger, creators of the Nouvelle Revue française (NRF), took interest in this, and integrated the collection into Gallimard on 31 July 1936. In 1939, André Gide became the first author to be published while still living, with the partial publication of his diary. In 1940, Jacques Schiffrin was fired by Gaston Gallimard because of the anti-Jewish laws. Jean Paulhan took the direction of the collection.

Directors of the collection:

- 1931–1940: Jacques Schiffrin
- 1960–1966: Jean Ducourneau
- 1966–1987: Pierre Buge
- 1988–1996: Jacques Cotin
- After 1997: Hugues Pradier

== Books ==
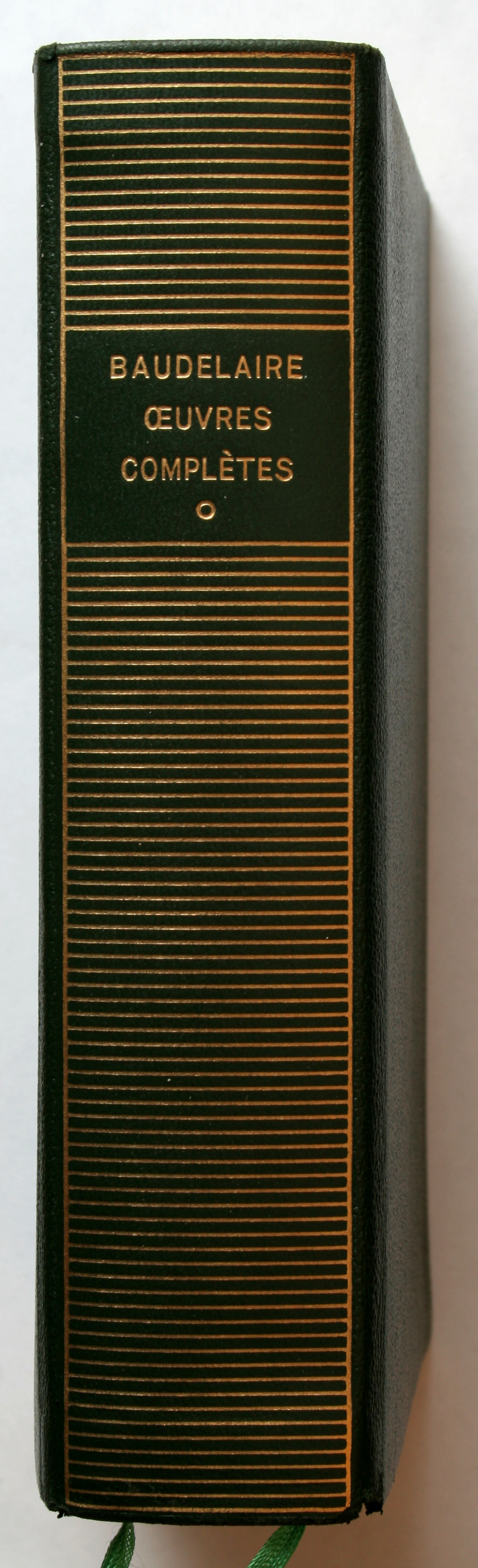
Spine with gold lettering

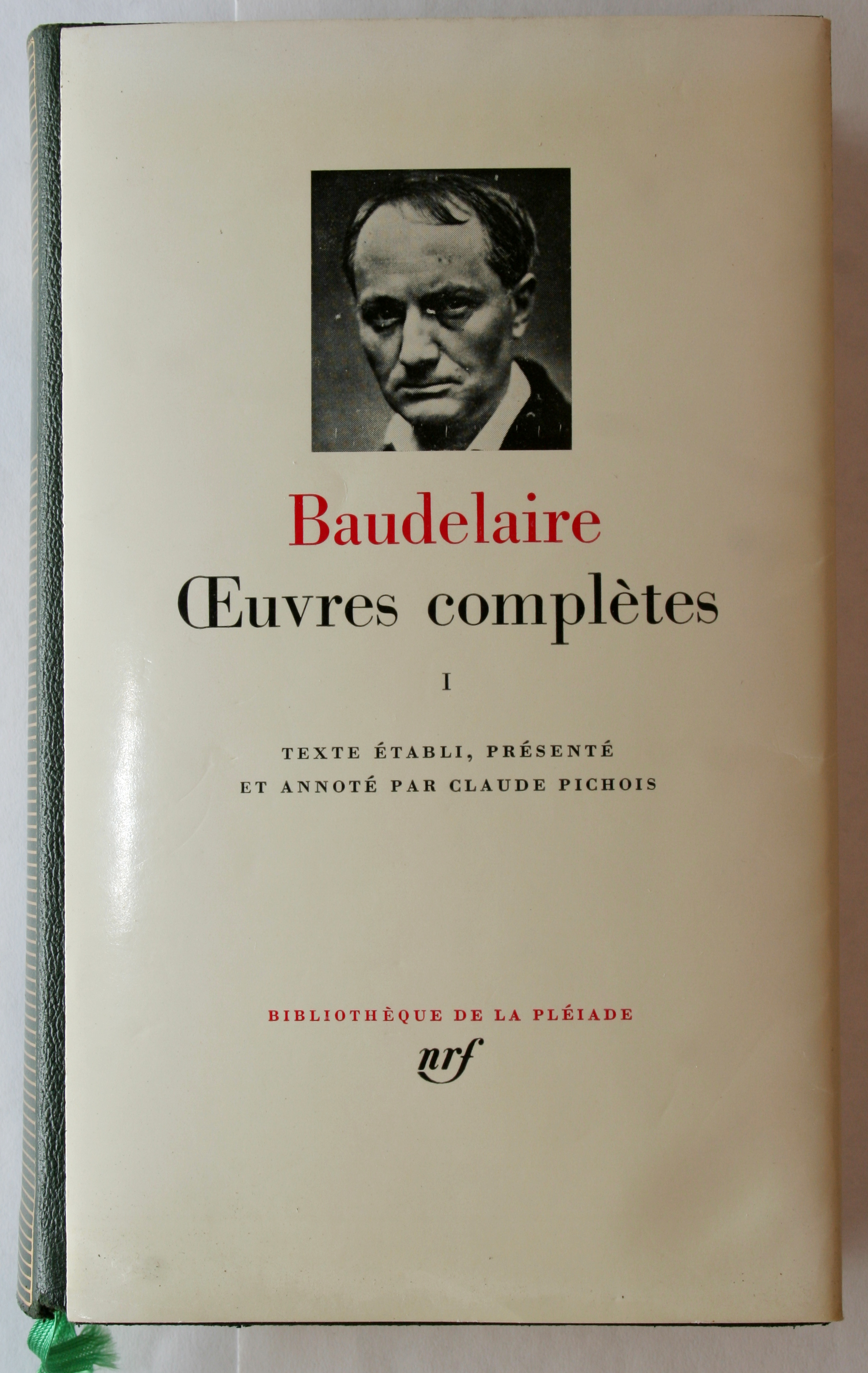
Title page of a work of Charles Baudelaire in the Bibliothèque de la Pléiade

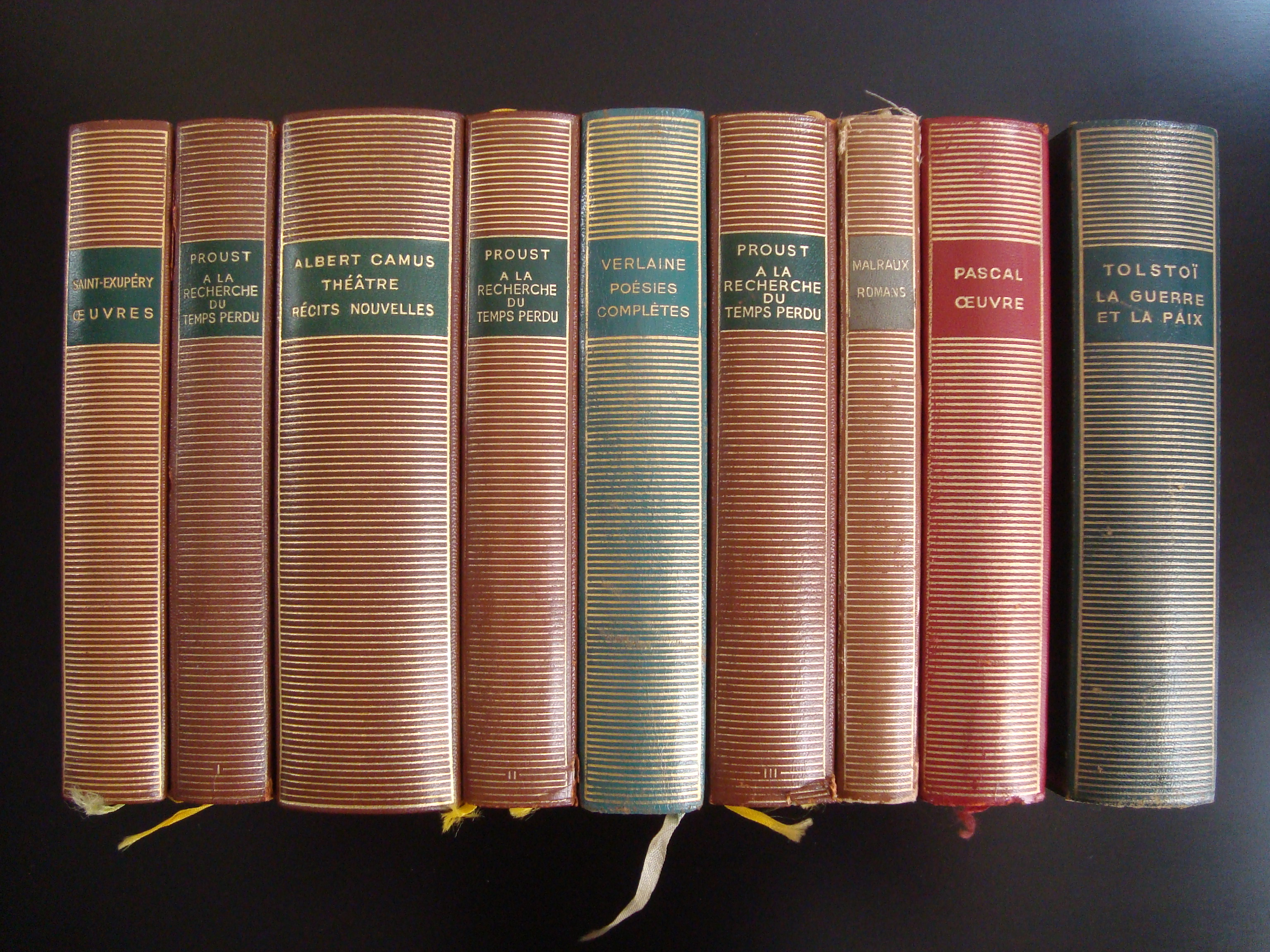
Various volumes

=== Binding ===
Each of the volumes published presents a similar high-quality appearance: a leather binding, stamped in gold on the spine, enclosing a text block on bible paper, all in a practical small format. The use of bible paper allows the books to contain a high number of pages; it is common for a Pléiade book to contain 1,500.

The leather covers of the books are also colour-coded according to period: 20th-century literature comes in tobacco leather; 19th-century, in emerald green; 18th-century, in blue; 17th-century, in Venetian red; 16th, in Corinthian brown; the Middle Ages, purple; Antiquity, green; spiritual texts, grey; and anthologies, in red. The books are sold in a transparent rhodoïd dust jacket, and inserted in a white printed cardboard slipcase, although multiple volumes are often sold in a single slipcase.

=== Edition ===
The books are critical editions, with annotations, comments, manuscript and editorial variants and accompanying documents. The preparation of these critical editions can take many years for a team of specialists, which accounts partly for the books' generally steep cost. For works written in languages other than French, new French translations are usually created.

In the 1960s and 1970s, an Encyclopédie de la Pléiade in the same format was also created, under the direction of Raymond Queneau.

== Authors published ==
At the beginning of 2017, the collection includes nearly 800 books and more than 250 authors (collective works excluded):

- Bibliothèque de la Pléiade : 787 volumes;
- Albums de la Pléiade : 56 volumes;
- Encyclopédie de la Pléiade : 54 volumes

The authors who were alive when published in the Bibliothèque de la Pléiade are:

- René Char (1983)
- Paul Claudel (1948)
- André Gide (1939, 1st)
- Louis Ferdinand Celine (1961)
- Julien Gracq (1989)
- Julien Green (1998)
- Eugène Ionesco (1991)
- Philippe Jaccottet (2014, 15th)
- Milan Kundera (2011, 14th)
- Jean d'Ormesson (2015, 16th)
- Claude Lévi-Strauss (2008, 13th)
- André Malraux (1947)
- Roger Martin du Gard (1955)
- Henry de Montherlant (1972)
- Nathalie Sarraute (1996)
- Saint-John Perse (1972)
- Marguerite Yourcenar (1982)
- Mario Vargas Llosa (2016)
- Philip Roth (2017)

== Albums ==
The Bibliothèque de la Pléiade also publishes an Album de la Pléiade every summer, which is an illustrated book in the same format as the rest of the series, usually dedicated to one of the writers but sometimes also dedicated to writers from a specific time period (1989 album) or to an important topic (1970 and 2009 albums) from the collection. The Albums are offered for free with the purchase of three books in the series. They are often collected.

== See also ==
- Library of America
- L'Équarrissage pour tous
