= Isabelle Gallimard =

French publisher and entrepreneur (born 1951)

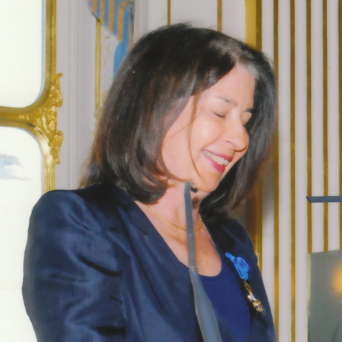
- Frédéric Mitterrand gives her the insignia of officer in the national order of Merit on September 26, 2011, at the Ministry of Culture
- Born: Paris
- Occupation: Publisher
- Parents: Claude Gallimard (father); Simone Gallimard (mother)
- Family: Christian Gallimard (brother); Antoine (brother); Françoise Gallimard

Isabelle Gallimard (born 4 January 1951 in Boulogne-Billancourt) is a French publisher and entrepreneur.

== Biography ==
Born in Paris the daughter of Claude and Simone Gallimard, Isabelle Gallimard studied sociology at the Sorbonne. From 1974 to 1984, she worked for cinema and television, notably in the service of the literary adaptations of Antenne 2 and the Gaumont cinematheque. In 1985, she became head of the audiovisual department of the Éditions Gallimard, then she entered the reading committee of this house in 1988, where she created the "Biblos" series in 1990.

In 1995, she took over the management of the Mercure de France, where she created new collections, and published French authors including Andreï Makine (prix Goncourt et prix Médicis 1995 and a member of the Académie française), Gilles Leroy (prix Goncourt 2007), Denis Podalydès (prix Femina Essai 2008), Gwenaëlle Aubry (prix Femina 2009), francophones (Raphaël Confiant, Louis-Philippe Dalembert, Kettly Mars, Gisèle Pineau, Sami Tchak…) and foreigners (Julian Barnes, American Marlena de Blasi, Indian Anne Cherian, Jerome Charyn…), as well as poets (Adunis, Yves Bonnefoy, Vénus Khoury-Ghata, Jean-Michel Maulpoix, Franck Venaille…).

Isabelle Gallimard is co-main shareholder of groupe Madrigall. and, as such, is a director of Gallimard and Flammarion.

=== Launch of series ===
- 1995: creation of « Petit Mercure ».
- 1998: creation de la « Bibliothèque étrangère ».
- 1999: creation of « Temps retrouvé poche ».
- 2003: revival of « Temps retrouvé » large format.
- 2004: creation of « Traits et portraits », with the publication of L’Africain by J. M. G. Le Clézio.
- 2014: creation of « Le Mercure Noir ».
