= Malatesta (play) =

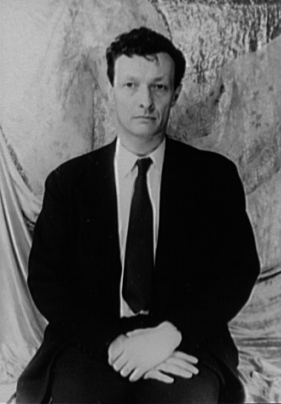
- Jean-Louis Barrault directed and starred in the first production of the play.
- Written by: Henry de Montherlant
- Original language: French

Premiere
- Date premiered: 19 December 1950
- Place premiered: Théâtre Marigny, Paris

Malatesta is a play by the French writer Henry de Montherlant, written in 1943–1944 and first published in 1946. It was first performed on stage in 1950.

== Plot ==
Sigismondo Malatesta, the 15th-century ruler of Rimini, is offered the cities Spoleto and Foligno if he gives up his own city to the troops of Pope Paul II. Malatesta is furious and goes to Rome to assassinate the Pope, but ends up accepting an honorary office in the Vatican. After falling ill, Malatesta is brought back to Rimini by his wife Isotta. Back in his home he is poisoned by the learned Porcellio and dies.

== Themes ==
The play portrays the vulnerability of a man who is at once unsuspecting and immoral. The sacrilegious and immoral hero ties in with Henry de Montherlant's typically preferred protagonist. He exemplifies what Montherlant called alternance, which refers to the contrary aspects found within the same character: Malatesta is simultaneously able to kill casually and show tender human emotions, and simultaneously flirts with many women and is attached to his wife. The hero's demise ties in with Friedrich Nietzsche's writings about the superior man and his greater vulnerability when compared to the herd man, and the period setting correlates with Nietzsche's admiration for the Renaissance period.

== Production history ==
The play was first performed on 19 December 1950 at the Théâtre Marigny in Paris. Jean-Louis Barrault directed the production and starred in the title role.

It was shown on BBC TV in December 1964 in the Wednesday Play series. https://www.memorabletv.com/tv/the-wednesday-play-malatesta-bbc-drama-patrick-wymark/
