= Sofía Àchaval de Montaigu =

Argentine fashion designer and stylist

- Born: Buenos Aires, Argentina
- Education: Studio Berçot
- Occupations: Fashion model; stylist; editor; designer
- Spouse: Thibault de Montaigu
- Children: 2

Sofía Àchaval de Montaigu is an Argentine fashion model, stylist, editor and designer.

== Early life ==
Sofía Àchaval was born and raised in Buenos Aires. Her family owned farms on the Pampas where she would spend summers as a child. She went to film school in Buenos Aires.

== Career ==
Àchaval de Montaigu moved to Paris in 2003 at the age of 22 to study fashion at Studio Berçot. Her first modelling job was in a campaign for Mulberry. She also walked the runway for Marc Jacobs and Louis Vuitton. She was also featured in campaigns for Chloé. After finishing school, she started working at Azzaro as an intern and later as an assistant to Vanessa Seward. Àchaval de Montaigu retired from modelling and was hired by the American fashion magazine V as a stylist, eventually becoming the editor-at-large.

In 2018, Àchaval de Montaigu partnered with Lucila Sperber and Delfina Blaquier to create the fashion label Àcheval Pampa. On 4 March 2019, their 2019-2020 Fall/Winter collection made its debut at Paris Fashion Week.

In 2019, she worked as a fashion correspondent for Daily Front Row.

== Personal life ==
Àchaval de Montaigu is married to French journalist and writer Thibault de Montaigu. They have two children and have residences in Paris and Buenos Aires.
