= Antoine Gallimard =

French editor and business owner (born 1947)

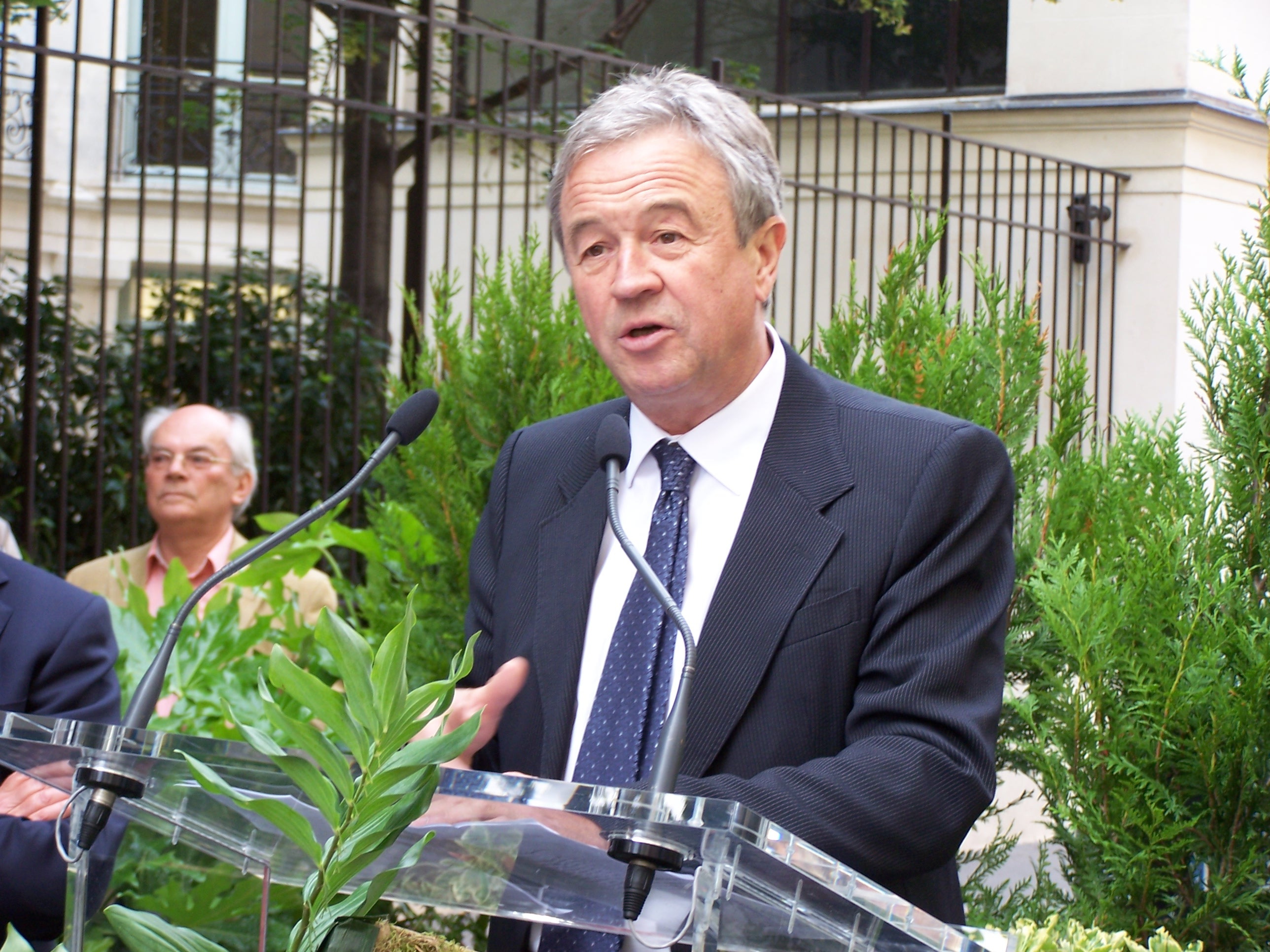
- Antoine Gallimard in June 2011.
- Born: 19 April 1947 (age 79); Paris, France
- Occupations: Publisher, Business executive
- Parent(s): Claude Gallimard (father); Simone Gallimard (mother); Gaston Gallimard (grandfather)
- Family: Christian Gallimard (brother); Isabelle Gallimard (sister); Françoise Gallimard (sister)

Antoine Gallimard (born 19 April 1947 in Paris) is a French publisher and company boss, president of Éditions Gallimard and Groupe Madrigall.

== Biography ==
Antoine Gallimard is one of the four children of Claude Gallimard and Simone Gallimard, son and daughter-in-law of Gaston Gallimard, the founder of Éditions Gallimard in 1911. Antoine Gallimard has four daughters including Charlotte (1980–), appointed CEO of Casterman in November 2012.

Claude Gallimard succeeded his father, Gaston Gallimard, at the head of Éditions Gallimard in 1975. Antoine Gallimard was entrusted in 1988 by his father to take the reins of the publishing group after the eldest son and designated heir, Christian Gallimard, left after a major disagreement with his father in 1984. In spite of his youth and his relative lack of experience, Antoine Gallimard (who had thought of becoming a professor of philosophy, and whose father had forcibly steered him towards the Faculty of Law in Assas) imposed himself and succeeded in bringing out Gallimard of the family conflict in which they had almost foundered.

In 2000, after considering buying the electronic publishing company Bibliopolis, he abruptly put an end to this project. On 5 January 2003, Antoine Gallimard announced that he and his close associates in the holding company Groupe Madrigall now owned 98% of the family business, following the repurchase of minority shareholders. In February 2011, in an interview with Télérama, he explained the state of the company, a hundred years after its creation:

Since the year 2000, we are actually going through a happy phase. It's a breath. The engine for me is that Gallimard remains a house that knows how to attract authors, convince them to come, a house that receives literary prizes but is also able to do without. We can experience difficult times in the same way, and I am constantly preparing for it. Nothing can be foreseen. Except to do the opposite of his trade. To note, for example: at this moment, it is the vampires who are successful, so I will order a series to such an author ... "As for this" desire to write ", he says: I had the chance to come to the head of Gallimard at a time when the book market was favorable. They were the Trente Glorieuses of the edition. There was enormous progress in the youth and pocket sector, and there was still a hard core of great readers. Today, all this is called into question. The pocket market has shrunk slightly, the vitality of the youth sector depends on commercial successes such as the Harry Potter or Twilight series".

Antoine Gallimard was president of the Syndicat national de l'édition. He is president of the "Association pour le développement de la librairie de création" (ADELC).

== Distinctions ==
- Commandeur of the Legion of Honour.
- Récipiendaire de la Creu de Sant Jordi Award.

== Bibliography ==
- Gallimard, un éditeur à l'œuvre, Alban Cerisier, coll. "Découvertes Gallimard" (#569), éditions Gallimard, 2011.
- Le Roman du XXe siècle, in Nouvelle Revue Française #596, February 2011.
