= Claude Gallimard =

French publisher

- Born: 10 January 1914
- Died: 29 April 1991 (aged 77)
- Occupation: Publisher
- Spouses: Simone Gallimard; Colette Rousselot (divorced)
- Father: Gaston Gallimard
- Family: Christian Gallimard; Antoine Gallimard (son); Isabelle Gallimard (sister); Françoise Gallimard (sister)

Claude Gallimard (10 January 1914 – 29 April 1991) was a French publisher and business leader.

The son of Gaston Gallimard, he was, from 1976 to 1988, the head of the publishing house Gallimard, founded by his father in 1911.

== Biography ==
Claude Gallimard worked in the family business of which he would become the president at the death of his father on 15 January 1976.

Married to Simone Cornu, he had with her four children who all worked in the book trades: Françoise, Christian, Antoine, and Isabelle.

In 1988, ill, Claude Gallimard handed the management of the group to his son Antoine, after removing his eldest son, Christian.
