= Paula Jacques =

French novelist

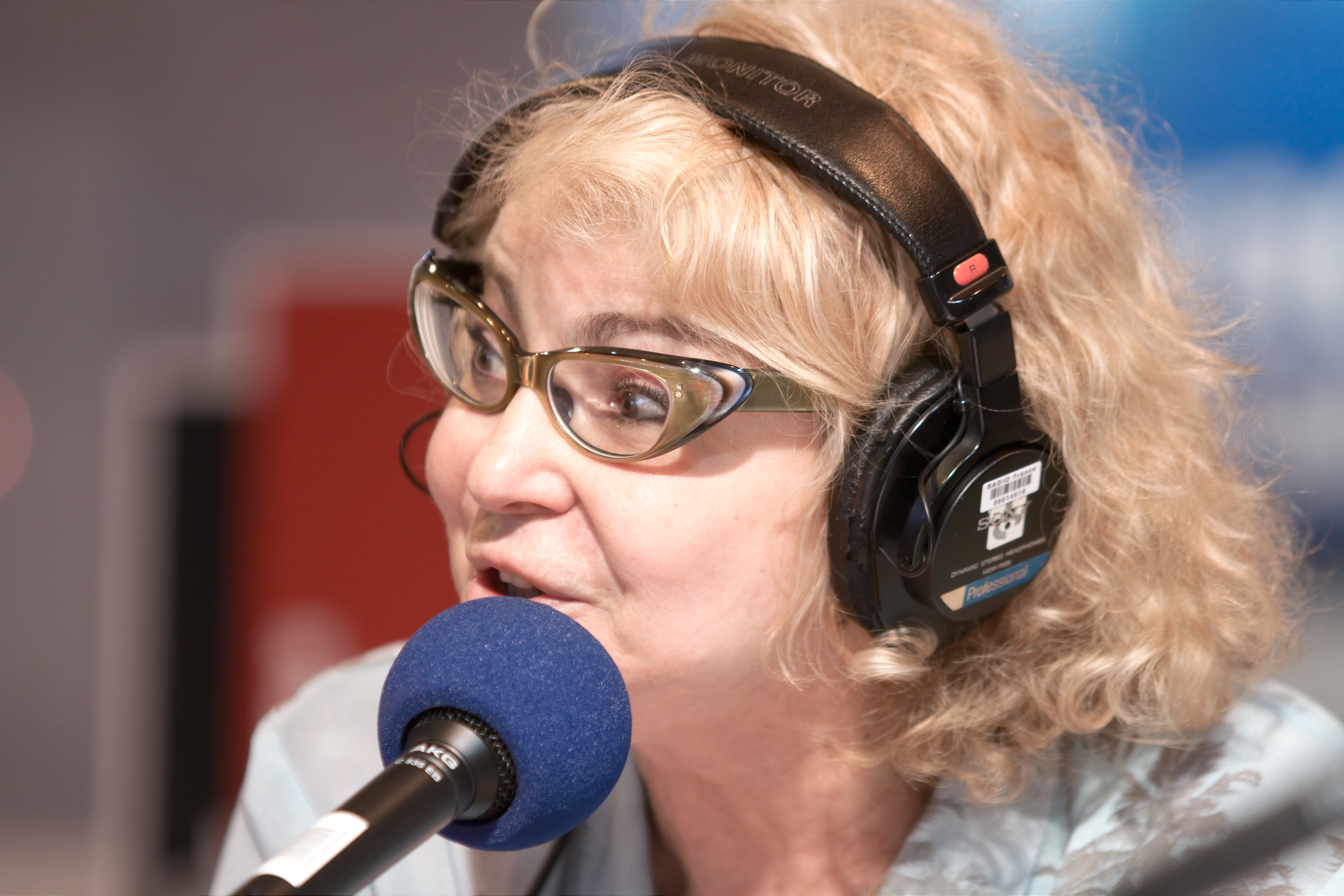
- Born: Paula Abadi; 8 May 1949 (age 77); Cairo, Egypt
- Writing career
- Language: French
- Notable work: Deborah et les anges dissipés
- Notable awards: Prix Femina

Paula Jacques (born Paula Abadi on 8 May 1949) is a French novelist, journalist, and host of the programme Cosmopolitaine on the French public station France Inter.

Jacques was born in Cairo, Egypt. She and her family were expelled from Egypt in 1957 during the period of nationalization under President Gamal Abdel Nasser. The family immigrated to Israel where Jacques lived on a kibbutz for three years. In 1961, Jacques and her family left Israel for France.

Jacques' novels focus exclusively on the Jews of Egypt, mainly during the 1940s and 1950s. Her novels can be described as reflecting the postcolonial condition.

In the novels, both Egyptian Jews and Muslims interact in day-to-day activities. In a few novels, like Gilda Stambouli souffre et se plaint (2002)and Un Baiser froid comme la lune (1983), Jacques takes her characters from Egypt to France and Israel where they face issues of acculturation. The characters' relationship with the French language and culture is problematized and so is their relationship to Israel.

Jacques's characters confront hostility, humiliation, conflicted ideologies, political instability, and cultural alienation. The novels explore the conditions under which Jews lived in Egypt in the years and days before their peremptory expulsion; the most developed cases are Lumière de l'oeil, L'Héritage de la tante Carlotta, Les Femmes avec leur amour, and the tragic La Descente au paradis. In her novels, Jacques describes the suffering and humiliation experienced by both Jews and Muslims and shows both perspectives.

Alongside her novelistic production, Jacques has been involved in French theatre, radio, and the press.

Jacques is the winner of the Prix Femina, 1991, for Deborah et les anges dissipés.

== Books ==
- Lumière de l’oeil. Paris: Mercure de France, 1980. English translation: Light of my Eye. Teaneck NJ: Holmes & Meier, 2009.
- Un Baiser froid comme la lune. Paris: Mercure de France, 1983.
- L’Héritage de Tante Carlotta. Paris: Mercure de France, 1987.
- Déborah et les anges dissipés. Paris: Mercure de France, 1991. (Winner of the Prix Femina)
- La Descente au paradis. Paris: Mercure de France, 1995.
- Les Femmes avec leur amour. Paris: Mercure de France, 1997.
- Gilda Stambouli souffre et se plaint. Paris: Mercure de France, 2002.
- Rachel-Rose et l’officier arabe. Paris: Mercure de France, 2006.
- Kayro Jacobi: Juste avant l'oubli: Mercure de France, 2010.
- Au Moins il ne pleut pas: Stock, 2015.
- Children's story: Samia la rebelle.
