= Jacques Rivière =

French writer, critic and editor (1886–1925)

- Born: 15 July 1886; Bordeaux, France
- Died: 14 February 1925 (aged 38); Paris, France
- Occupations: Critic, writer, editor
- Spouse: Isabelle Alban-Fournier (m. 1909)
- Writing career
- Period: 1912–1925
- Notable works: Nouvelle Revue Française (editor, 1919–1926)

Jacques Rivière (French pronunciation: [ʒak ʁivjɛʁ]; 15 July 1886 – 14 February 1925) was a French "man of letters"—a writer, critic and editor who was "a major force in the intellectual life of France in the period immediately following World War I". He edited the magazine La Nouvelle Revue Française (NRF) from 1919 until his death. He was influential in winning a general public acceptance of Marcel Proust as an important writer. His friend and brother-in-law was Alain-Fournier (Henri Alban-Fournier), with whom he exchanged an abundant correspondence.

== Biography ==
Rivière was born in Bordeaux, the son of an eminent physician. He became friends with Henri-Alban Fournier (later known as Alain-Fournier) at the Lycée Lakanal in Sceaux, Hauts-de-Seine. Both students prepared for the entrance examination for the École Normale Supérieure, and both failed. Rivière returned to Bordeaux in 1905, and from that date until Alban-Fournier's death in 1914 maintained a frequent correspondence with him.

Rivière obtained an arts degree in Bordeaux, performed his military service, and returned in 1907 to Paris. There he prepared a thesis at the Sorbonne on the Theodicy of Fénelon, while earning a living as a teacher at the Stanislas College. He was influenced by Maurice Barrès, André Gide and Paul Claudel, with whom he corresponded. On 24 August 1909, Rivière married Isabelle Alban-Fournier, his friend Henri's younger sister. In 1913, he explicitly declared his Catholicism.

After writing for the literary revue L'Occident, Rivière became a sub-editor of the NRF in 1912. He also began to write literary criticism, which he collected and published with the title Études (Studies). The essays in this book reveal Rivière's excellent sense of psychology.

Rivière was mobilized in 1914 in the 220th infantry, and was captured on 24 August, in an early battle. Imprisoned in a camp near Königsbrück, Saxony, he attempted several escapes, which caused him to be transferred to a disciplinary camp in Hülsberg, Hanover. His memoirs of his captivity there were published in 1918 with the title L'Allemand : souvenirs et réflexions d'un prisonnier de guerre (The German: memories and reflections of a prisoner of war). Eventually he became seriously ill, and was transferred to Switzerland where he was interned until the end of the war.

Soon after the end of the war, Rivière restarted the NRF (the publication of which had been stopped during the war). With Rivière's direction, publication of the NRF resumed on 1 June 1919, and it later published the works of such writers as Marcel Proust, François Mauriac, Paul Valéry, Saint-John Perse, Jean Giraudoux and Jules Romains. Rivière is remembered primarily for his 1923–24 exchange of letters with Antonin Artaud, for the remarkable ways Artaud resists Rivière's attempts at critical, literary, even psychological reduction. About this time Rivière largely neglected his own career as a writer, and wrote only one short psychological novel, Aimé, published in 1922. At Proust's insistence, he was awarded the Prix Blumenthal in 1920.

Rivière died of typhoid fever on 14 February 1925 in Paris. After his death, Rivière's wife devoted herself to the posthumous classification and publication of many of his works.

== Works ==
- Études (1912)
- L’Allemand : souvenirs et réflexions d'un prisonnier de guerre (1918)
- Aimée (1922)
- À la trace de Dieu (1925)
- Correspondance de Jacques Rivière et Alain-Fournier (1926–1928)
- Correspondance avec Paul Claudel (1926)
- Carnet de guerre (1929)
- Rimbaud (1931)
- Moralisme et Littérature, dialogue avec Ramon Fernández (1932)
- Florence (1935; unfinished novel)
- Carnets 1914-1917 (1977)
