= Nicolas Bréhal =

French novelist and literary critic

Nicolas Bréhal (Gérald Solnitzki) (6 December 1952 Paris – 31 May 1999 Levallois-Perret) was a French novelist and literary critic.

He was literary director at the Mercure de France and literary critic at Le Monde and Le Figaro.

He won the Prix Valery Larbaud and Grand prix des lectrices de Elle in 1992, for Sonate au clair de Lune. He won the 1993 Prix Renaudot, for Les Corps célestes.

== Works ==
- Les Étangs de Woodfield, Mercure de France, 1978
- Portrait de femme, l'automne: roman, Mercure de France, 1980
- La Pâleur et le Sang, 1983; French & European Publications, Incorporated, 1988, ISBN 978-0-7859-2101-1
- L'Enfant au souffle coupé, Gallimard, 1989, ISBN 978-2-07-038159-3
- Neiges: pièce en quatre actes, Mercure de France, 1995, ISBN 978-2-7152-1934-2
- Le Sens de la nuit, 1998; Gallimard, 2001, ISBN 978-2-07-041463-5
- Sonate au clair de Lune, Mercure de France, 1993, ISBN 978-2-07-038800-4, Grand prix des lectrices de Elle
- Les Corps célestes, Gallimard, 1993, ISBN 978-2-07-073594-5
- Le parfait amour: roman, Mercure de France, 1995, ISBN 978-2-7152-1920-5
- La légèreté française: théâtre, Mercure de France, 2002, ISBN 978-2-7152-2288-5
