= Kettly Mars =

Haitian poet and novelist

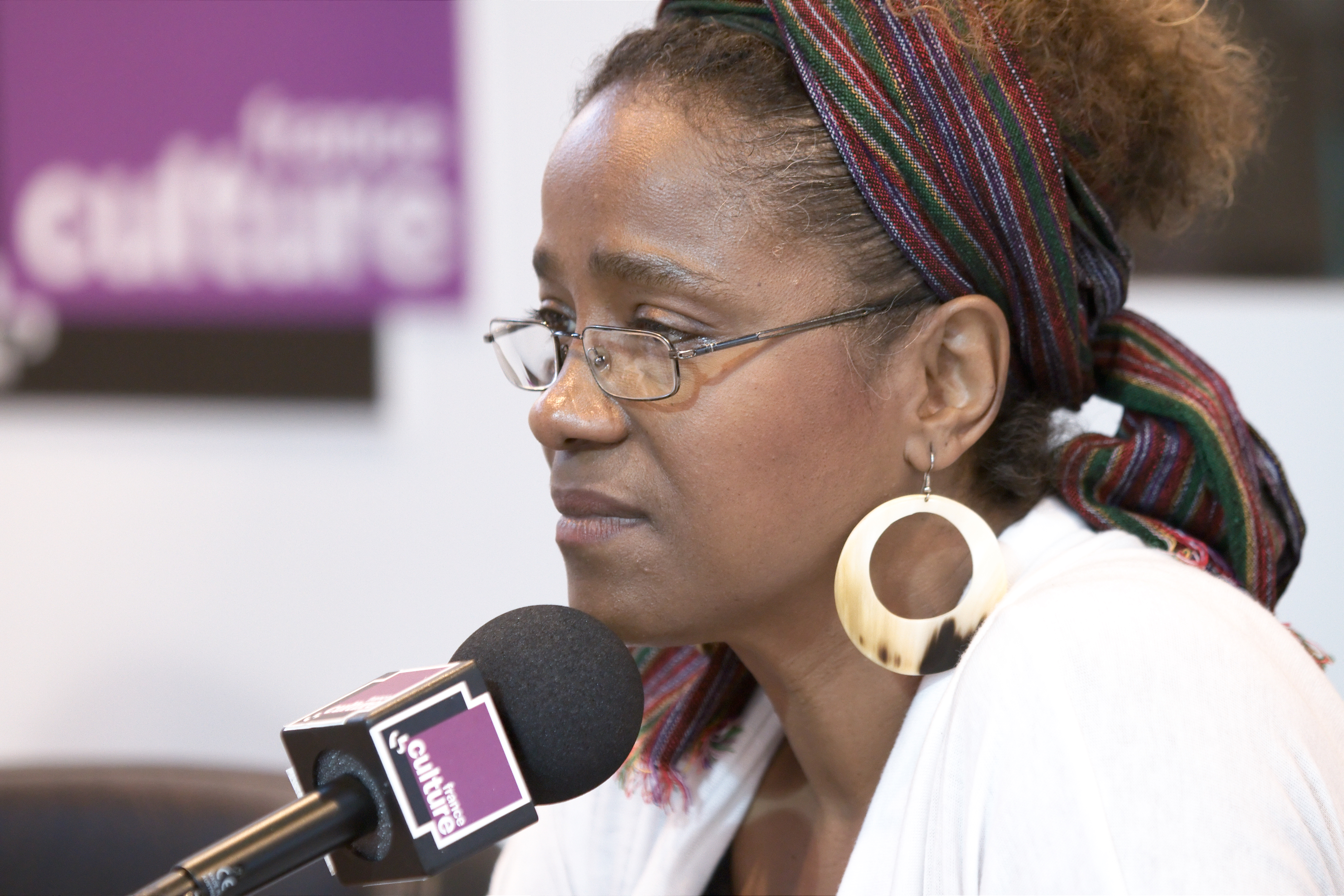
Kettly Mars

Kettly Pierre Mars is a Haitian poet and novelist. She writes in French and Creole, and her books have been translated into Creole, English, Italian, Dutch, Danish, and Japanese. She is recognized as a major figure in post-Duvalier and contemporary Francophone Caribbean literature.

== Life ==
Mars was born on September 3, 1958, in Port-au-Prince, Haiti, just one year after the start of the Duvalier regime. After completing a degree in Classics, Mars pursued training in administration – working as an administrative assistant for a number of years. Once in her thirties, Mars began to dedicate her time to writing.

In a 2015 interview with Radio France Internationale, Mars said that once she was in her mid-thirties "everything that had constituted my life, until that point, started to lose its significance." Apart from being a mother, Mars says that her writing is "the most satisfying gift she has ever been given." Although she does not practice Haitian Vodou, she sees it as a great source of creativity, calling it, "an extraordinary source of inspiration."

In a 2025 interview Mars stated that being raised in Haiti influenced her writing and storytelling. She made the point that she often comes by inspiration for her works from Haitian life, spirituality and culture. Mars was born during a period where Haiti was under a strict dictatorship by Francois Duvalier and next by his son. In interviews, Mars elaborates and states that she didn't know to ask herself questions about the quality of life because certain harsh aspects were normalized. It was only into her adulthood that she started to seek how the dictatorship affected life in Haiti. These experienced later shaped themes in her poetry and novels.

As Mars's perception of Haiti's socio-political state deepened, Mars directed these reflections into her writing; leading her to be a strong literary voice for Haiti. Mars is the author of numerous collections of poems, short stories, young adult novels, and seven novels, Mars is one of the most active contemporary Haitian writers. Her work has appeared in various literary anthologies in both French and Kreyòl, such as the 2014 Anthologie bilingue de la poésie créole haïtienne de 1986 à nos jours edited and translated by Mehdi Chalmers, Inéma Jeudi, Jean-Laurent Lhérisson, and Lyonel Trouillot. In 2015, her novel Je suis vivant was awarded the Prix Ivoire pour la Littérature Africaine d’Expression Francophone at a ceremony in Abidjan in November.

== Career ==
Early in Mars's career she gained recognition through short stories and poetry that reflected Haiti's identity, political trauma, and spirituality; especially during the Duvalier Dictatorship which was a totalitarian hereditary dictatorship. Her writing career officially started picking up speed in the late 1990s with the publication of her first poetry collection, Feu de miel (1997), followed by Feulements et sanglots (2001). While she began as a poet, critics note that she transitioned to the novel form to more fully explore the complexities of Haitian society. Her debut novel, Kasalé (2003), marked a significant turning point in her career, establishing her as a writer interested in the intersection of modern Haitian life and ancestral traditions.. 2

Mars also served as the President of Centre PEN Haïti, where she worked to promote the voices of women in Francophone literature and edited anthologies of women's writing.

== Themes/Style ==
Scholars characterize Mars's literary style by its "vivid realism," which often contrasts with the "marvelous realism" traditionally associated with older generations of Caribbean writers. Her work frequently tackles taboo subjects within Haitian culture.

- Sexuality and Gender: A central theme in Mars's work is the use of sexuality and the body as a site of political and social commentary. In novels such as L'heure hybride (2005) and Saisons sauvages (2010), Mars depicts eroticism not merely for shock value, but to expose power dynamics, hypocrisy, and the vulnerabilities of women in a patriarchal society. Critics have argued that Mars uses the female body to challenge the "silence" imposed by both social conservatism and political oppression.
- Political History and Memory: Mars is noted for her engagement with the "Duvalierist" legacy. Rather than focusing solely on the dictator figure, she examines the psychological impact of authoritarianism on ordinary families and intellectuals. Her characters often navigate the moral ambiguities of surviving under a dictatorship, blurring the lines between victim and collaborator.
- Spirituality: While her style is realist, Mars integrates elements of Haitian Vodou as a complex, living system of belief rather than a folkloric backdrop. In works like Kasalé, spirituality is presented as an essential link to the land and memory.

== Major works ==
=== Kasalé ===
Mars' first novel, Kasalé is a portrait of a rural Haitian community set in Rivière-Froide, not far from Port-au-Prince. In this novel, Mars explores rural family dynamics, the culture of the Lakou, and Vodou in a way that places Kasalé in a genealogy of novels of rural Haiti like Fonds des Nègres by Marie Vieux-Chauvet and Les Gouverneurs de la rosée by Jacques Roumain. Presenting her novel at the Alliance Française d'Haïti in 2005, Mars cited the need to "lucidly, respectfully, and honestly" evoke the Vodou tradition in Haiti because it is too frequently treated like "a mirror in which [Haitians] refuse to see themselves."

=== Saisons Sauvages ===
One of Mars' most powerful novels, Saisons sauvages recounts the kidnapping of a journalist named Daniell Leroy during the early years of François Duvalier's dictatorship. Although the narration shifts between Daniel's journal and other characters, Nirvah Leroy, Daniel's wife, is the central figure of the narrative. Throughout the novel, Nirvah searches for traces of Daniel's whereabouts, visiting the Secretary of State Raoul Vincent in order to gather information, talking with neighbors and family members, and scouring a captive Port-au-Prince to find her husband. Nirvah eventually discovers that her husband has been imprisoned by the government for his seditious, communist writing and stands very little chance of ever being released.

Keeping the memory of her husband alive by reading his intimate journal, Nirvah attempts to maintain the lives she and her family lived before the Duvalier regime tore it apart. Among other themes, Saisons sauvages is a reflection on dictatorship, gendered and sexual violence, and the uses of Vodou in Haiti during the reign of François Duvalier. Saisons sauvages is Mars' novel which has received the most critical attention, especially in the North American academy, with entire book chapters and articles dedicated to the novel. Saisons sauvages is the first of Mars' works to be translated into English (translation by Jeanine Herman), which appeared in the University of Nebraska Press's French translation series in the summer of 2015.

=== Aux Frontières de la soif ===
Aux Frontières de la soif is a novel set in the aftermath of the earthquake that struck Haiti on January 12, 2010. According to Martin Munro, Mars did not wish to write a novel about the 2010 earthquake because it represented a clichéd "duty" of Haitian artists. However, while traveling to the port of La Gonave Mars witnessed the dysfunction of the "camps" set up by various NGOs following the earthquake and was compelled to write Aux Frontières de la soif. Camp Canaan, which is represented in the novel, resembles other "relief camps" established in Haiti as temporary housing sites that eventually morphed into semi-permanent locales.

The plot follows Fito Belmar and his incursions into Canaan as he engages in sexual acts with women and girls reduced to prostitution following the earthquake, qualifying Fito as a pedophile. The brutal reality of the situation in Canaan is accompanied by the arrival of Fito's Japanese friend Tatsumi, a professor of Francophone Caribbean literature who has come to write about the earthquake. As Munro notes, both Fito and Tatsumi profit off of the earthquake in various ways – one through pernicious sexual activities and the other via a more subtle intellectual opportunism. In Aux Frontières de la soif, Mars issues a reflection on the internal and external pressures on Haiti and Haitians in the wake of a humanitarian disaster.

=== Je suis vivant ===
Mars' most recent novel, Je suis vivant tells the story of a bourgeois Haitian family that suddenly has to welcome Alexandre back home after the mental health facility where he has spent the last three decades is forced to shut down because of the January 12, 2010 earthquake. While in the institution, Alexandre has visions, hears voices, and witnesses the earthquake from inside the walls. He notes that for once the cries and histrionics came from outside the institution's walls.

Alexandre, however, is not the only character to make a return to the family house in the suburb of Fleur-de-Chêne. His younger sister, Marylène, returns to Haiti after studying and launching a career as a painter in Brussels. Coming back to the Caribbean, Marylène finds herself worn out, adorned with a pacemaker, and seeks new beginnings as she falls in love with Norah, the woman she has employed to model for her recent paintings.

These parallel returns relieve and weigh heavily on Éliane, the family matriarch and aging mother who is admittedly being kept alive by the virtue of a series of medications and careful attention. Throughout the novel the narrative voice shifts between first person accounts from the various siblings and Éliane, a style that Mars employed in Saisons sauvages. In the end, Je suis vivant is a novel about returns and re-discovery; one that explores questions of ability, sexuality, and family. The critical reception of the novel has been strong, and the novel received the Prix Ivoire in November 2015.

== Awards ==
- 1996: Prix Jacques-Stephen Alexis (for her short story collection.)
- 2006: Prix Senghor de la Création Littéraire for L'heure hybride.
- 2011: Bourse Barbancourt
- 2011: Bourse de la Découverte from the Prince Pierre Foundation (Monaco) for Saisons sauvages.
- 2015: Prix Ivoire

== Bibliography ==
Mars has written numerous volumes of poems and short stories. Here is a list of Mars' novels:

- 2003: Kasalé, Vents d'Ailleurs, ISBN 978-2911412448
- 2005: L’heure hybride, Vents d'Ailleurs, ISBN 978-2911412363
- 2008: Fado, Mercure de France, ISBN 978-2715228535
- 2010: Saisons sauvages, Mercure de France, ISBN 978-2715229464 (translated as Savage Seasons, Nebraska University Press, 2015)
- 2011: Le prince noir de Lillian Russell, with Leslie Péan, Mercure de France, ISBN 978-2715232006
- 2013: Aux Frontières de la soif, Mercure de France, ISBN 978-2715233652
- 2015 Je suis vivant, Mercure de France, ISBN 978-2715239319
- 2018: L'heure hybride, collection Legba (format poche), Mémoire d'encrier, ISBN 978-2897125714
