= Groupe Madrigall =

French holding company

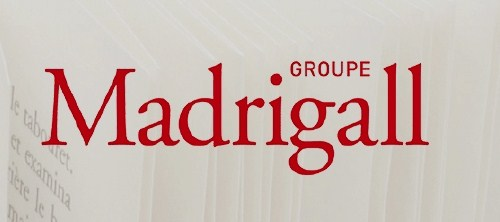
- Type: Société anonyme
- Industry: Publishing
- Founded: 1992; 34 years ago
- Headquarters: Paris, France
- Key people: Antoine Gallimard
- Website: gallimard.fr/Le-groupe-Madrigall

Groupe Madrigall (Note: The name "Madrigall" is an anagram of the name "Gallimard".) is a French publishing holding company. It is the parent company of several publishing houses and distribution companies including: Éditions Gallimard, Flammarion and Casterman. Groupe Madrigall is the third largest French publishing group.

== History ==
Groupe Madrigall is a holding company founded in 1992. It is controlled by Antoine Gallimard, director of Éditions Gallimard, and his sister Isabelle Gallimard, director of Mercure de France. Groupe Madrigall took over a majority share in Éditions Gallimard in the late 1990s. At the end of the 1990s, the Gallimard family repurchased shares from two of the company's three main corporate shareholders, namely the Italian publisher Einaudi (then owned by the holding company of Silvio Berlusconi, Fininvest via Arnoldo Mondadori Editore) and the French media agency Havas. Havas was forced to sell its shares after it was ruled that Havas's merger with Vivendi rendered it a direct competitor. As a result, Madrigall had a 60 percent majority holding in Éditions Gallimard. In January 2003, Madrigall repurchased the Gallimard holdings of five other outside shareholders for €92,000,000. As a result, Madrigall had a 98 percent majority holding.

In September 2012, Madrigall acquired Groupe Flammarion, previously owned by the Italian RCS MediaGroup, for €251,000,000.

In October 2013, the French conglomerate LVMH acquired a stake of up to 9.5% in Groupe Madrigall to the tune of €30,000,000, in particular to pay off Groupe Madrigall's debt after the purchase of Flammarion in 2012.

In June 2021, Madrigall acquired Les Éditions de Minuit.

In January 2023, the Competition Commission of Switzerland opened an investigation into Madrigall's holding company to examine whether it was unlawfully restricting the ability of Swiss booksellers to obtain supplies in France.

On April 19, 2023, Antoine Gallimard appointed his two eldest daughters, Charlotte and Laure, as managing directors of the Madrigall group, alongside him.

Publishing groups Flammarion Ltd. and Gallimard Ltd. decide to merge in 2024 to create the Madrigall Canada group.

== Structure ==
- Publishing subsidiaries
  - Éditions Gallimard
  - Gallimard Jeunesse
  - Gallimard Loisirs (tourist guides)
  - Éditions Denoël
  - Mercure de France
  - Éditions de la Table ronde
  - Éditions P.O.L
  - Éditions Alternatives
  - Futuropolis [fr]
  - Les Grandes Personnes
  - Éditions Flammarion
  - Hoëbeke
  - J'ai lu
  - Éditions Verticales
  - Casterman
  - Éditions Sarbacane
  - Les Éditions de Minuit
- Distribution subsidiaries
  - Sodis
  - Centre de diffusion de l'édition (CDE)
  - France Édition Diffusion (FED)
  - Sofédis
  - Éditions Foliade (Belgium)
  - Éditions des Cinq Frontières (Switzerland)
  - Gallimard Limitée & Socadis (Canada)
  - Union Distribution
  - Flammarion Diffusion
  - Eden Livres (electronic publishing)
- Bookstores, a total of eight, in Paris, Metz, Nancy and Strasbourg.
