= Jean Schlumberger (writer) =

French writer, journalist and poet (1877–1968)

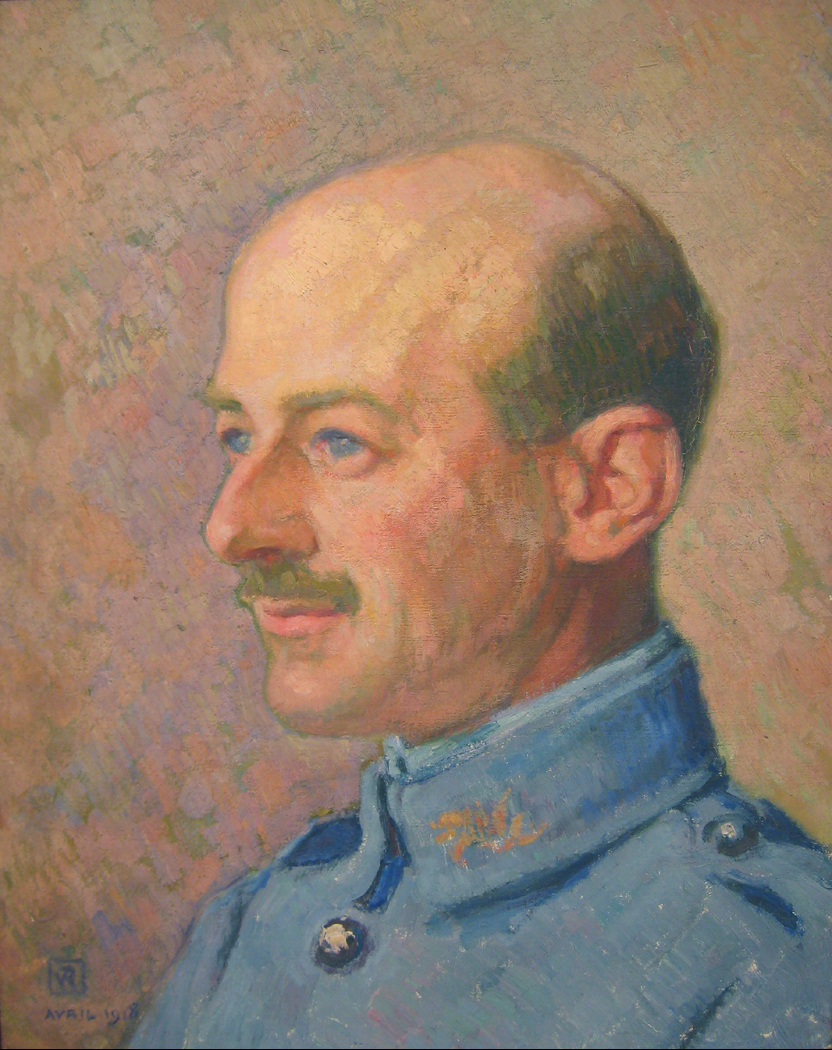
Jean Schlumberger (Théo van Rysselberghe, 1914)

Jean Schlumberger (born Paul Conrad Nikolaus Johann Schlumberger; 26 May 1877 – 25 October 1968) was a French writer, journalist and poet. He was born in Guebwiller, Alsace-Lorraine, and died in Paris.

== Biography ==
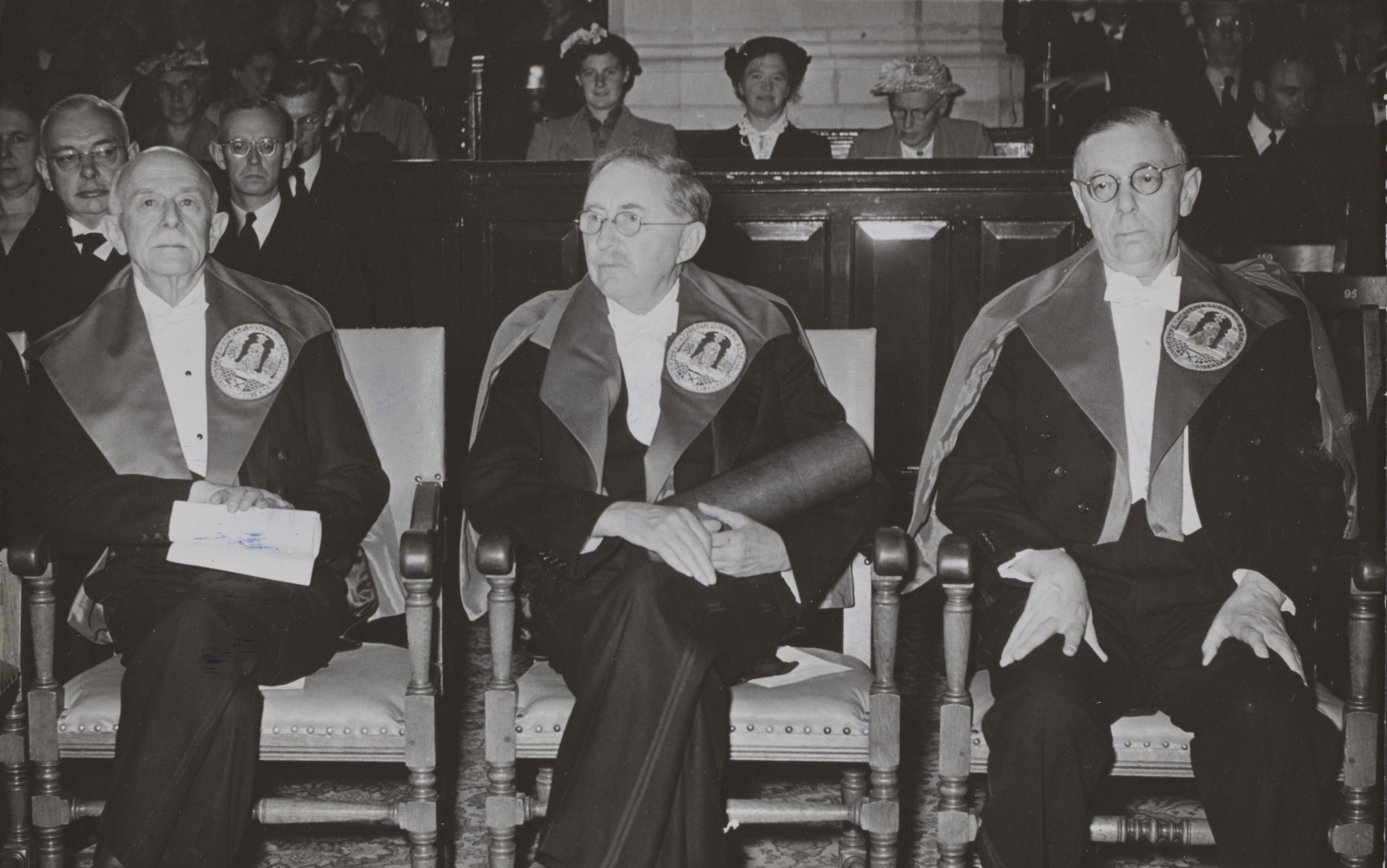
Honorary doctorate of Leiden University (1954)

Schlumberger was the son of Paul Schlumberger, the scion of a textile manufacturing family of Alsatian origin, and Marguerite de Witt, the granddaughter of François Guizot. Two of his brothers, Conrad and Marcel, founded the Schlumberger company.

Schlumberger is best known as a writer of novels, plays and books of poetry. He was co-founder (with André Gide and Gaston Gallimard) of the Nouvelle Revue Française, a French literary journal. He counted the famous writer Marguerite Yourcenar among his friends. His non-fiction, especially his autobiography, Éveils, has been neglected by critics and literary historians.

Schlumberger was awarded an honorary doctorate from Leiden University in 1954, together with E. M. Forster and Victor E. van Vriesland.

== Works ==
- La mort de Sparte (The Death of Sparta). This play premièred at the Théâtre du Vieux-Colombier in Paris in 1921, and was not well received by the critics or the public.
- Césaire, play.
- Les fils Louverné, play.
- Le camarade infidèle (The Unfaithful Friend), novel, 1922.
- Plaisir à Corneille – Promenade Anthologique, 1936.
- Saint Saturnin (English title: The Seventh Age or Saint Saturnin), 1932.
- Le lion devenu vieux (The Lion Grown Old)
