= Henry de Montherlant =

French writer (1895–1972)

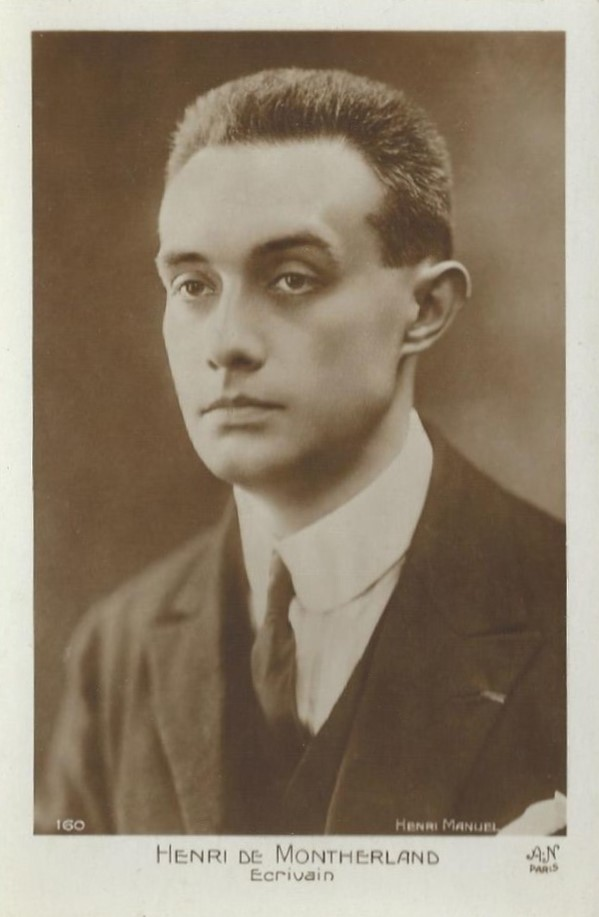
- de Montherlant c. 1925
- Born: Henry Marie Joseph Frédéric Expedite Millon de Montherlant; 20 April 1895; Paris, France
- Died: 21 September 1972 (aged 77); Paris, France
- Writing career
- Period: Early-mid 20th century

Henry Marie Joseph Frédéric Expedite Millon de Montherlant (French: [ɑ̃ʁi də mɔ̃tɛʁlɑ̃]; 20 April 1895 – 21 September 1972) was a French essayist, novelist, and dramatist. His most famous play written in 1942 is La Reine morte, still studied today in French high schools. It was translated into English under the title 'Queen After Death'. He was elected to the Académie française in 1960.

== Biography ==
Born in Paris, a descendant of an aristocratic (yet obscure) Picard family, Henry Montherlant was educated at the Lycée Janson de Sailly and the Sainte-Croix boarding school at Neuilly-sur-Seine. Henry's father was a hard-line reactionary. He despised the post-Dreyfus Affair army as too subservient to the Republic, and refused to have electricity or the telephone installed in his house. Henry's mother, a formerly lively socialite, became chronically ill due to difficult childbirth. She was bedridden most of the time, and died at the young age of 43.

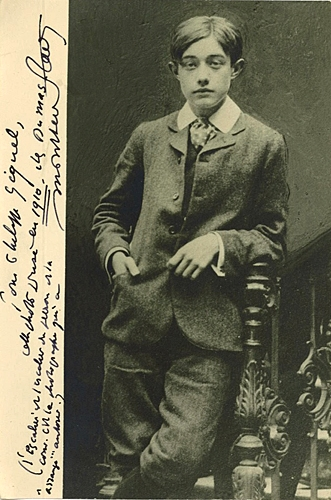
de Montherlant in 1910

From the age of seven or eight, Henry was enthusiastic about literature and began writing. In 1905 reading Quo Vadis by Henryk Sienkiewicz gave him a lifelong fascination with Ancient Rome and prompted a proficient interest in Latin. He was enthusiastic about school comradeship, sports and bullfighting. When he was 15, his parents sent him alone on a trip to Spain, where he became initiated in the corrida. He killed two young bulls. He was also a talented draughtsman, often portraying nudes.

On 5 April 1912, aged almost seventeen, Henry was expelled from the Catholic Sainte-Croix de Neuilly. Together with five other youngsters, he had founded a group called 'La Famille' (the Family), a kind of order of chivalry whose members were bonded by an oath of fidelity and mutual assistance. A member of that group was Philippe Jean Giquel (1897–1977), two years younger than Henry. Montherlant was enamored with him but they had no physical contact. According to Montherlant, this "special friendship" had aroused the fierce and jealous opposition of abbé de La Serre, who arranged to have the older youth expelled. This incident (and Giquel) became a lifelong obsession of Montherlant. He drew on the incident for his 1952 play La Ville dont le prince est un enfant and his 1969 novel Les Garçons. Also, in his adult years, he had renewed his platonic friendship with Giquel. By then married, Giguel invited the writer to be the godfather of his daughter Marie-Christine.

After the deaths of his father and mother in 1914 and 1915, Montherlant went to live with his doting grandmother and eccentric uncles. Mobilised in 1916 during World War I, he was wounded and decorated. Marked by his experience of war, he wrote Songe ("Dream"), an autobiographic novel, as well as his Chant funèbre pour les morts de Verdun ("Funeral Song for the Dead at Verdun"), both exaltations of heroism during the Great War. Le Paradis à l’ombre des Epées ("Paradise in the Shadow of Swords") was entered in the literature competition at the 1924 Olympics in Paris but did not win a medal.

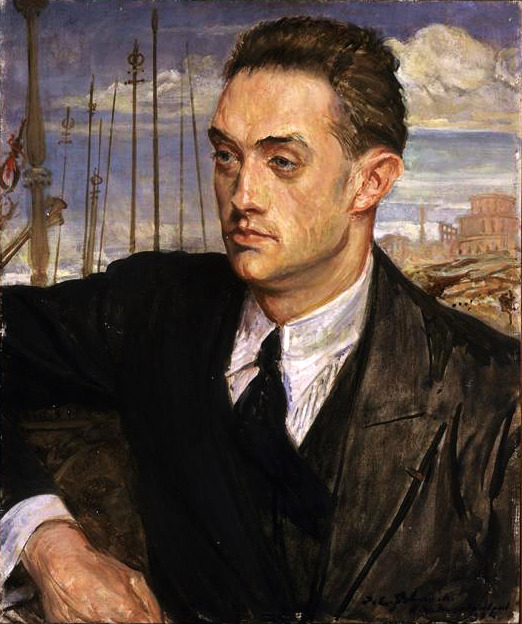
1922 portrait of de Montherlant by Jacques-Émile Blanche

Montherlant first achieved critical success with the 1934 novel Les Célibataires. He sold millions of copies of his tetralogy Les Jeunes Filles, written from 1936 through 1939. In these years Montherlant, a well-to-do heir, traveled extensively, mainly to Spain (where he met and worked with bullfighter Juan Belmonte), Italy, and Algeria.

During the Second World War after the fall of France in 1940, he remained in Paris. There he continued to write plays, poems, and essays, and worked as a war correspondent. Since he had been awarded the Grand Prix de Littérature de l'Académie française in 1934, he was considered among France's leading writers. He wrote in admiring tones of the victorious Germans, seeing in them members of a manly, stronger race.

After the war, he escaped the severe punishments meted out in France to other pro-German writers. The Committee for the Purification of Writers prohibited him from publishing anything, but limited the ban to one year. Montherlant's collaborationism was soon forgotten. In 1960, he became a member of the Académie Française.

In 1968, according to Roger Peyrefitte, the 72-year-old Montherlant was attacked and beaten up by a group of youths outside a movie theatre in Paris because he had groped one of them. Montherlant was blinded in one eye as a result. The British writer Peter Quennell, who edited a collection of translations of his works, recalled that Montherlant attributed the eye injury to "a fall" instead; he noted that Montherlant suffered from vertigo.

Montherlant suffered increasing loss of sight and became the target of critics such as Peyrefitte. In 1972 he committed suicide, shooting himself in the head after swallowing a cyanide capsule.

As he had requested, his ashes were scattered by Jean-Claude Barat and Gabriel Matzneff in Rome, at the Forum, among the Temple of Portunus, and into the Tiber.

His biography was written by Pierre Sipriot and published in two volumes (1982 and 1990).

== Works ==
His early successes were works such as Les Célibataires (The Bachelors) in 1934, and the highly anti-feminist tetralogy Les Jeunes Filles (The Young Girls) (1936–1939), which sold millions of copies and was translated into 13 languages. His late novel Chaos and Night was published in 1963. The novels were praised by writers as diverse as Aragon, Bernanos, and Malraux. Montherlant was well known for his anti-feminist and misogynistic views, as exemplified particularly in The Girls. Simone de Beauvoir considered his attitudes about women in detail in her The Second Sex.

He wrote plays such as Pasiphaé (1936), La Reine morte (1942, the first of a series of historical dramas), Malatesta (1946), Le Maître de Santiago (1947), Port-Royal (1954) and Le Cardinal d'Espagne (1960). He is particularly remembered as a playwright. In his plays as well as in his novels he frequently portrayed heroic characters displaying the moral standards he professed, and explored the 'irrationality and unpredictability of human behaviour'.

He worked as an essayist also. In the collection L'Equinoxe de septembre (1938) he deplored the mediocrity of contemporary France and in Le solstice de Juin, (1941), he expressed his admiration for Wehrmacht and claimed that France had been justly defeated and conquered in 1940. Like many scions of the old aristocracy, he had hated the Third Republic, especially as it had become in the aftermath of the Dreyfus Affair. He was in a "round-table" of French and German intellectuals who met at the Georges V Hotel in Paris in the 1940s, including the writers Ernst Jünger, Paul Morand and Jean Cocteau, the publisher Gaston Gallimard and the Nazi legal scholar Carl Schmitt. Montherlant wrote articles for the Paris weekly, La Gerbe, directed by the pro-Nazi novelist and Catholic reactionary Alphonse de Châteaubriant.

Montherlant is remembered for his aphorism "Happiness writes in white ink on a white page", often quoted in the shorter form "Happiness writes white".

== Reception, honours and awards ==
Les célibataires was awarded the Grand prix de littérature de l'Académie française in 1934, and the English Northcliffe Prize. In 1960 Montherlant was elected a member of the Académie française, taking the seat which had belonged to André Siegfried, a political writer. He was an Officer of the French Ordre national de la Légion d'honneur.

He was much acclaimed by Jean Mauriac, Romain Rolland, André Maurois, Andre Gide, and Georges Bernanos, who called him "perhaps the greatest of our living writers." That was in 1939. Marguerite Yourcenar called him a "great writer," but noted that she found some of his writing to be "obtuse and crudely brutal." German director Rainer Werner Fassbinder references Les Jeunes Filles in two films: Das kleine Chaos (1967) and Satansbraten (1977). In the short film Das kleine Chaos the character portrayed by Fassbinder himself reads aloud from a paperback German translation of Les Jeunes Filles, a book which he claims to have stolen.

Writing in 1993, Pierre Lapaire noted that even among his detractors, "Montherlant's style is recognized for its richness, power and classicism."

== Translations and adaptations ==
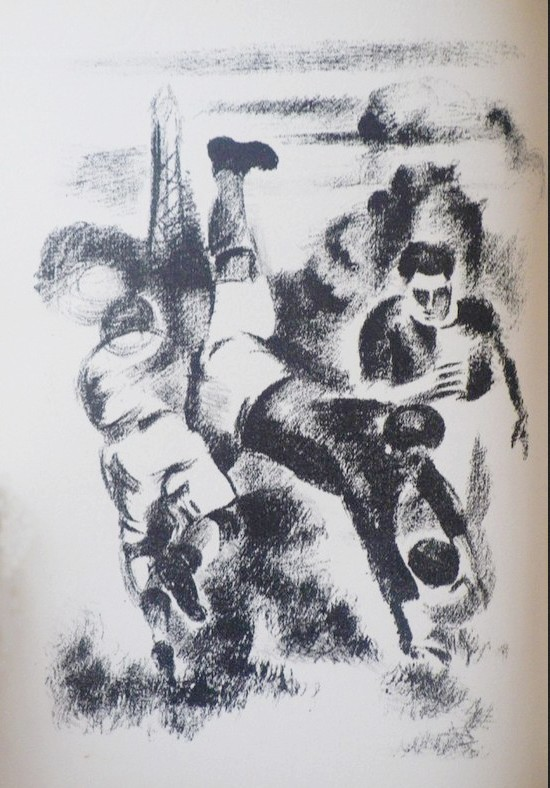
Lithograph by Robert Delaunay for an edition of La Relève du matin (1928)

John Weightman translated a selection of Montherlant's essays into English in 1960.

Terence Kilmartin, best known for revising the Moncrieff translation of Proust, translated some of Montherlant's novels into English, including a 1968 edition of the four volumes of Les Jeunes Filles, in English called simply The Girls.

In 2009, New York Review Books returned Montherlant to print in English by issuing Kilmartin's translation of Chaos and Night (1963) with a new introduction by Gary Indiana.

Christophe Malavoy directed and starred in a 1997 television movie adaptation of La Ville dont le prince est un enfant.

== Illustrated works ==
Some works of Henry de Montherlant were published in illustrated editions. Examples include Pasiphaé, illustrated by Henri Matisse, Les Jeunes Filles, illustrated by Mariette Lydis, and others illustrated by Jean Cocteau, Robert Cami, Édouard Georges Mac-Avoy, and Pierre-Yves Tremois.
