= Claude Faraggi =

French novelist

- Born: 28 May 1942; Clermont-Ferrand
- Died: 14 December 1991 (aged 49); Paris
- Writing career
- Language: French
- Notable works: Le Signe de la bête Le Maître d'heure
- Notable awards: Prix Fénéon (1972); Prix Femina (1975)

Claude Faraggi (28 May 1942 – 14 December 1991) was a French writer best known for his 1975 novel, Le Maître d'heure, which won the Prix Femina.

== Works ==
- 1965: Les Dieux du sable
- 1967: Le Jour du fou
- 1969: L'Effroi
- 1971: Le Signe de la bête, (awarded Fénéon Prize, 1972)
- 1975: Le Maître d'heure, (awarded Prix Femina)
- 1992: L'Eau et les Cendres
- 1992: Le Passage de l'ombre
- 1992: Les Feux et les Présages
- 1992: La Saison des oracles
