= Salvat Etchart =

French writer (1924–1985)

Salvat Etchart (1924 - 1985 Bordeaux) was a French writer, and winner of the 1967 Prix Renaudot.

== Biography ==
He moved to Martinique in 1955. He was critical of neo-colonial society. He taught French literature in Quebec, beginning in 1970.

== Works ==
- Une bonne à six, éditions Julliard, 1962; Un couple, éditions de la Mauvaise graine, 2003
- Les nègres servent d'exemple, éditions Julliard, 1964
- Le Monde tel qu'il est, Mercure de France 1967; la collection Babel, 2004, Prix Renaudot
- L'Homme empêché, Mercure de France, 1977
- L'Amour d'un fou, éditions des Presses de la Renaissance, 1984, ISBN 2-85616-304-1
- Le Temps des autres, Presse de la Renaissance, 1987
