= Nouvelle Revue Française =

French literary magazine

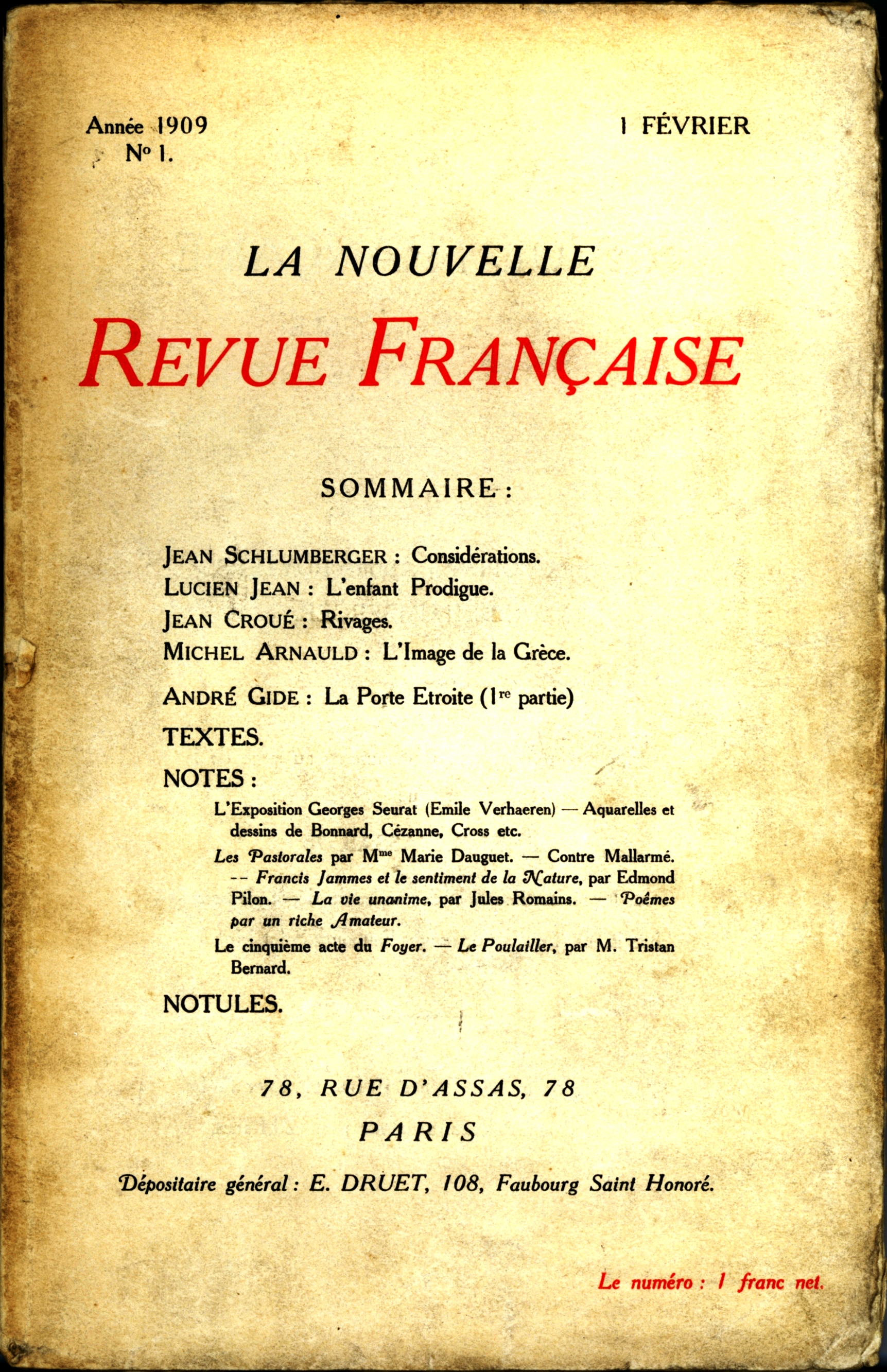
- Discipline: Literature
- Language: French

Publication details
- History: 1909–present
- Publisher: Éditions Gallimard (France)
- Frequency: Quarterly

Standard abbreviations
- ISO 4: Nouv. Rev. Fr.

Indexing
- ISSN: 0029-4802
- OCLC no.: 1716860

La Nouvelle Revue Française (French: [la nuvɛl ʁəvy fʁɑ̃sɛːz]; "The New French Review") is a literary magazine based in France. In France, it is often referred to as the NRF.

== History and profile ==
The magazine was founded in 1909 by a group of intellectuals including André Gide, Jacques Copeau, and Jean Schlumberger. It was established 'in opposition to other, more established, cultural institutions, most notably the Académie Française and its associated networks'.^{:4}

In 1911, Gaston Gallimard became editor of the Revue, which led to the founding of the publishing house, Éditions Gallimard. During World War I its publication stopped. The magazine was relaunched in 1919.

Established writers such as Paul Bourget and Anatole France contributed to the magazine from its early days. The magazine's influence grew until, during the interwar period, it became the leading literary journal, occupying a unique role in French culture. The first published works by André Malraux and Jean-Paul Sartre were in the pages of the Revue.

During the occupation in the second world war the NRF continued operations under the Vichy Regime, thanks to the work of Otto Abetz in negotiating terms with Gaston Gallimard. Then director Jean Paulhan resigned his position as director of the NRF and was replaced by Pierre Drieu la Rochelle.

Gide and Général de Gaulle gave explicit blessing to L'Arche, a literary review created by Jean Amrouche and edited by Edmond Charlot. It became effectively the replacement of the NRF in Free France (Algeria was the first part of France to be liberated). L'Arche commenced in 1944 (issues 1–6) and finished in 1947 (issues 23–27). Montreal, Tangiers and Algiers in this period became literary francophone centres replacing Paris.

After liberation of the whole of France, the NRF was banned for collaborationism, but reopened in 1953 (initially with a "new" title: La Nouvelle Nouvelle Revue Française).

The Revue was a monthly for many years, but became a quarterly.

== Directors ==
- 1908–1914: André Gide
  - Interruption due to war
- 1919–1925: Jacques Rivière
- 1925–1940: Jean Paulhan
- 1940–1943: Pierre Drieu La Rochelle
  - Banned for collaborationism (1944–1953)
- 1953–1968: Jean Paulhan
- 1968–1977: Marcel Arland
- 1977–1987: Georges Lambrichs
- 1987–1996: Jacques Réda
- 1996–1999: Bertrand Visage
- 1999–2010: Michel Braudeau
- 2010–present: Antoine Gallimard

== See also ==
- Collection Blanche
- List of literary magazines

== Sources ==
- Anna-Louise Milne, The Extreme In-Between: Jean Paulhan's Place in the Twentieth Century (Oxford: Legenda, 2006).
