= Michel Butel =

French journalist and novelist (1940–2018)

- Born: 19 September 1940; Tarbes, France
- Died: 26 July 2018 (aged 77)
- Occupations: Journalist, novelist

Michel Butel (19 September 1940 – 26 July 2018) was a French journalist and novelist. He won the Prix Médicis for L'Autre amour in 1977. He was the founding editor of L'Autre Journal, a political and literary magazine, from 1984 to 1993. He was also the founding editor of L'Impossible from 2011 to 2013.

== Biography ==
Michel Butel was born in Tarbes in 1940 to a lawyer mother and a father who went on to found the Social security in France. He left school at the age of 14.

Like his youthful friend Yves Janin, he failed as a teenager at the psycho-pedagogical institute in Saint-Maximin (Oise), then founded a protest and poetic journal, “La Cascade”.
