= Gaston Gallimard =

French publisher (1881–1975)

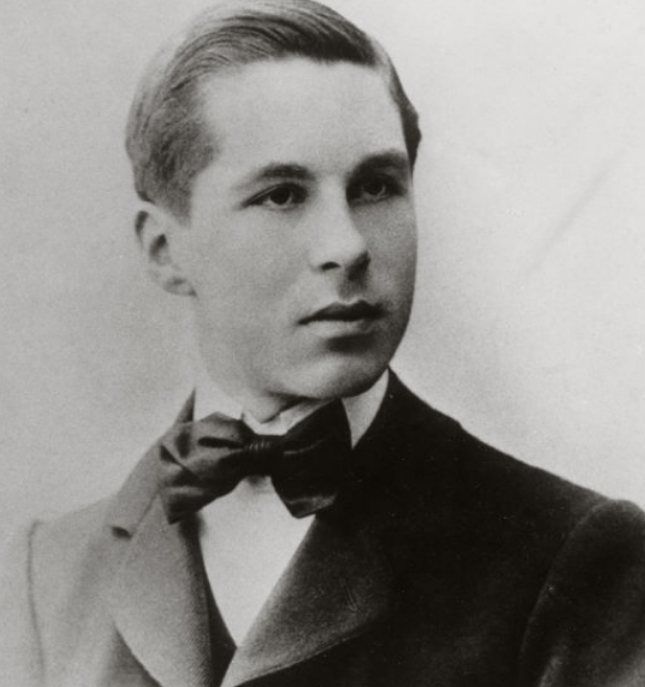
- Gaston Gallimard,1900
- Born: 18 January 1881; Paris, France
- Died: 25 December 1975 (aged 94); Neuilly-sur-Seine, France
- Occupation: Publisher
- Father: Paul Gallimard
- Family: Claude Gallimard (son); Simone Gallimard (daughter in law)

Gaston Gallimard (French: [ɡalimaːʁ]; 18 January 1881 – 25 December 1975) was a French publisher.

He founded La Nouvelle Revue Française in 1908, together with André Gide and Jean Schlumberger. In 1911 the trio established La Nouvelle Revue Française. In 1919, he created his own publishing house, named Librairie Gallimard, though he continued to work closely with the NRF. Éditions Gallimard is one of the leading French publishing houses.

In World War II during the German occupation of Paris a "round-table" of French and German intellectuals met at the Georges V Hotel including Gallimard, the writers Ernst Jünger, Paul Morand, Jean Cocteau, and Henry Millon de Montherlant and the legal scholar Carl Schmitt.

Gallimard, in October 1932, founded the Marianne (magazine: 1932-40).

== Works ==
=== Texts by Gaston Gallimard ===
- Friedrich Hebbel, Judith, five-act tragedy translated from German by Gaston Gallimard & Pierre de Lanux. Paris, Éditions de la Nouvelle Revue française, 1911.
- « Il a inventé des auteurs, un public », En souvenir de René Julliard, Paris, René Julliard, 1963, p. 50.

=== Correspondences ===
- Jean Paulhan / Gaston Gallimard, Correspondance, edition established, presented and annotated by Laurence Brisset, Gallimard, 2011.
- Marcel Proust / Gaston Gallimard, Correspondance, edition, presented and annotated by Pascal Fouché, Paris, Gallimard, 1989.
- Jacques Rivière / Gaston Gallimard, Correspondance 1911-1924, edition, presented and annotated by Pierre-Edmond Robert in collaboration with Alain Rivière, Paris, 1881

=== Bibliography ===
- Pierre Assouline, Gaston Gallimard : Un demi-siècle d’édition française, Balland, 1984, Folio, 2006
- Catalogue Gallimard. 1911-2011, 1711 p.
- Gallimard. Un siècle d'édition, Bibliothèque nationale de France/Gallimard, 2011
- Alban Cerisier, Gallimard. Un éditeur à l'œuvre, Gallimard, 2011, series "Découvertes Gallimard" #569
