= Éditions Gallimard =

French publishing company

- Parent company: Groupe Madrigall
- Founded: 31 May 1911; 115 years ago
- Founders: Gaston Gallimard; André Gide; Jean Schlumberger
- Country of origin: France
- Headquarters location: Paris
- Key people: Antoine Gallimard (CEO)
- Publication types: Books, Magazines
- Imprints: Bibliothèque de la Pléiade, Denoël, Flammarion, Gallimard Jeunesse, Mercure de France, Série noire
- Official website: www.gallimard.fr

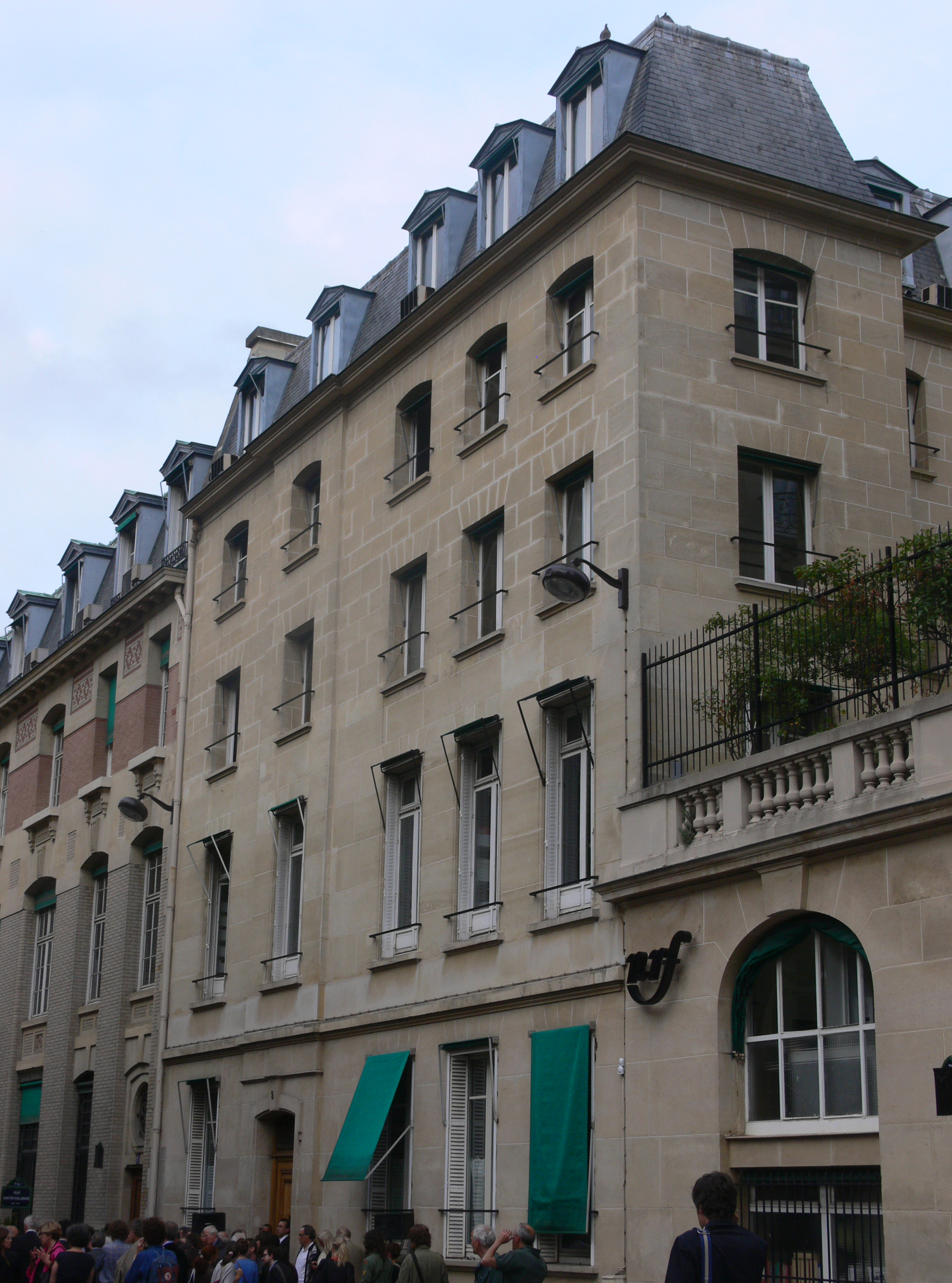
Éditions Gallimard

Éditions Gallimard (French: [edisjɔ̃ ɡalimaːʁ]), formerly Éditions de la Nouvelle Revue Française (1911–1919) and Librairie Gallimard (1919–1961), is one of the leading French book publishers. In 2003, it and its subsidiaries published 1,418 titles.

Founded by Gaston Gallimard in 1911, the publisher is now majority-owned by his grandson Antoine Gallimard.

Éditions Gallimard is a subsidiary of Groupe Madrigall, the third largest French publishing group.

In 2023, Éditions Gallimard was awarded the Mention Honorifique from Les Rencontres Philosophiques de Monaco for its Collection NRF-Essais.

== History ==
The publisher was founded on 31 May 1911 in Paris by Gaston Gallimard, André Gide, and Jean Schlumberger as Les Éditions de la Nouvelle Revue Française (NRF).

From its 31 May 1911 founding until June 1919, Nouvelle Revue Française published one hundred titles including La Jeune Parque by Paul Valéry. NRF published the second volume of In Search of Lost Time, In the Shadow of Young Girls in Flower, which became the first Prix Goncourt-awarded book published by the company. Nouvelle Revue Française adopted the name "Librairie Gallimard" in 1919.

During the occupation of France in World War II, Gaston Gallimard was hosted in Carcassonne by poet Joë Bousquet. He returned to Paris in October 1940 to enter discussions with the Third Reich authorities, who wished to control his publishing company. It was agreed that Gaston Gallimard would still control his company if he collaborated with the authorities and published pro-Hitler writings.

== Catalogue ==
Éditions Gallimard's best-selling authors include Albert Camus (29 million copies), Antoine de Saint-Exupéry (26.3 million copies) and J. K. Rowling (whose Harry Potter series sold 26 million copies). Other important authors include Salman Rushdie, Roald Dahl, Marcel Proust, Louis-Ferdinand Céline, Philip Roth, George Orwell, Jack Kerouac, Pablo Neruda and John Steinbeck.

As of 2011, its catalog consists of 36 Prix Goncourt winners, 38 writers who have received the Nobel Prize in Literature, and ten writers who have been awarded the Pulitzer Prize. In 2010 the company had a turnover of €230 million, and over 1,000 employees.

Gallimard acquired Groupe Flammarion from RCS MediaGroup in 2012.

== Subsidiaries ==
=== Publishing houses ===
- Éditions Denoël
- Les Éditions du Mercure de France
- Nouveaux Loisirs (tourist guides)
- Groupe Flammarion
- Futuropolis
- Gallimard Jeunesse
- Éditions P.O.L. (88%)
- Éditions de La Table Ronde
- Bibliothèque de la Pléiade

=== Diffusion and distribution ===
- SODIS
- SOCADIS (joint venture with Flammarion)
- Centre de Diffusion de l'Édition
- France Export Diffusion

== List of collections ==
- L'Arbalète/Gallimard
- L'Arpenteur
- L'Aube des peuples
- La Bibliothèque de la Pléiade
- Bibliothèque des histoires
- La Bibliothèque Gallimard
- Bibliothèque des idées
- Bibliothèque des sciences humaines
- La Blanche
- Le Cabinet des Lettrés
- Les Cahiers de la Nrf
- Le Chemin
- Connaissance de l'inconscient
- Continents noirs
- Le Débat
- Découvertes Gallimard
- Du Monde entier
- Folio
- Folio essais
- Folio histoire
- Folio actuel
- Folio bilingue
- Folio théâtre
- Folio plus
- Foliothèque
- Folio classique
- Folio policier
- Folio SF
- Folio documents
- Folio 2 €
- Folioplus classiques
- Haute enfance
- L'Imaginaire
- L'Infini
- Joëlle Losfeld
- Livres d'art
- NRF Biographies
- NRF Essais (founded and directed by Eric Vigne)
- La Noire
- Poésie/Gallimard
- Le Promeneur
- Quarto
- Série noire
- Le Temps des images
- L'Univers des formes
- L'Un et l'autre

== See also ==
- Books in France
