= German trilogy =

Trilogy of novels by Louis-Ferdinand Céline

- Castle to Castle; North; Rigadoon
- Author: Louis-Ferdinand Céline
- Original title: Trilogie allemande
- Country: France
- Language: French
- Publisher: Éditions Gallimard
- Published: 1957–1969

The German trilogy (French: Trilogie allemande) is three semi-autobiographical novels about the latter stages of World War II in Europe by the French writer Louis-Ferdinand Céline. It consists of Castle to Castle (published 1957), North (1960) and Rigadoon, finished on the day of Céline's death in 1961 and published in 1969. It is also known as the wartime trilogy, D'un château l'autre trilogy or simply the trilogy.

== Background and plot ==
The novels, narrated by Céline's alter ego, Ferdinand, are fictionalised chronicles of his experiences during the latter stage of World War II in Europe. Céline, who had been accused of collaboration with the Germans in occupied France, had fled Paris in June 1944 following the Allied landings at Normandy and death threats from the French Resistance. He had followed the collaborationist French government and the actor Robert Le Vigan (called La Vigue in the novels) into exile at the Sigmaringen enclave, and eventually fled to Denmark with his wife Lucette (called Lili in the novels) and their cat Bébert. The chronology is not strict but the novels mostly cover a time span from the beginning of June 1944 until March 1945.

== Themes ==
The novels are written as chronicles and use techniques inspired by the works of Jean Froissart, John of Joinville and Blaise de Monluc. They differ from Céline's earlier novels about Ferdinand Bardamu in that the main character is Céline himself, telling his story from a first-person perspective. They are however novels and include fantastical and hallucinatory passages. Céline's wife Lucette has been given the fictitious name Lili and his friend Le Vigan is called La Vigue.

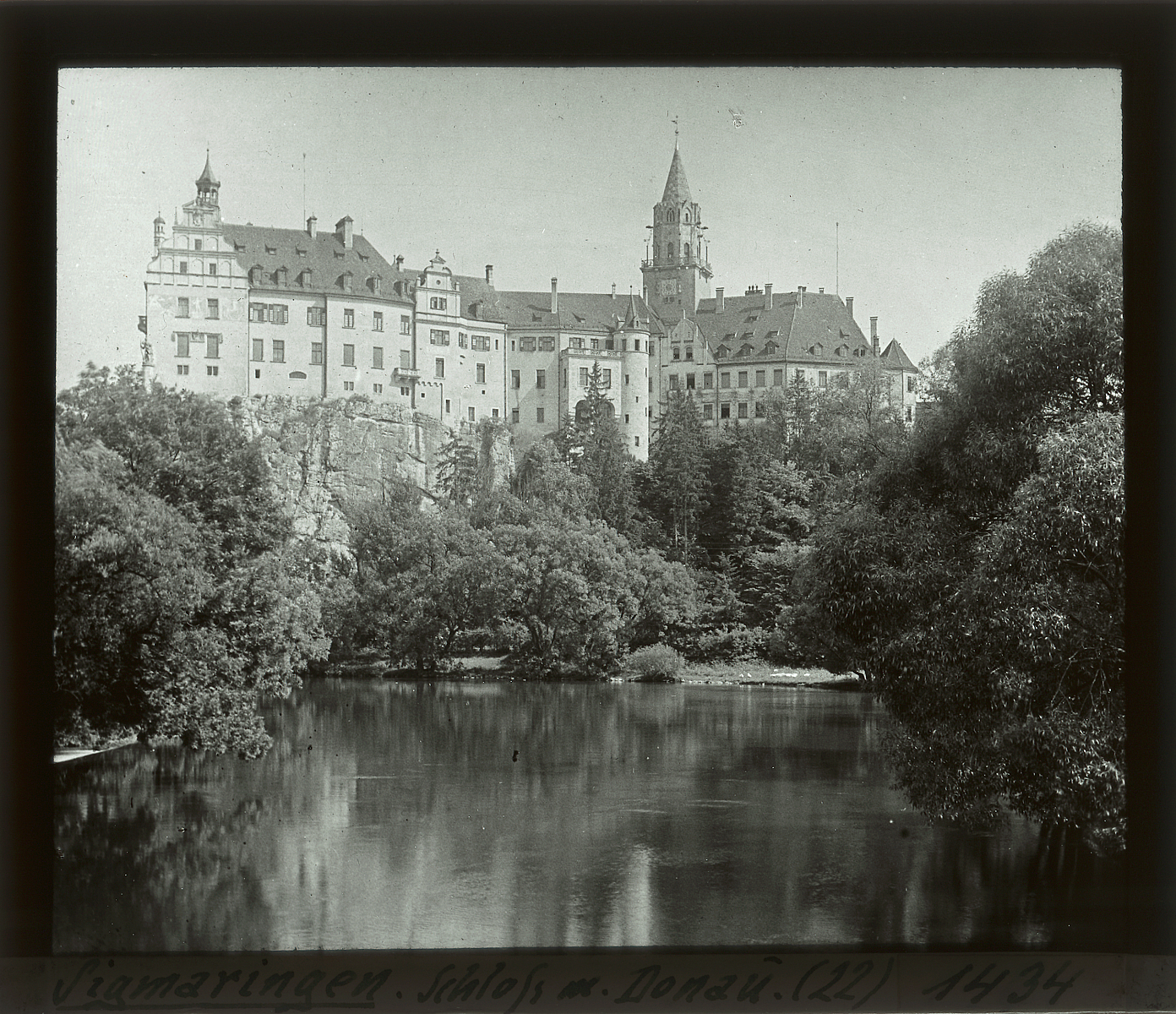
Sigmaringen Castle circa 1937

Interwoven with the personal narrative are references to the Gauls and Franks, including myths and legends associated with them. The scholar Andrea Loselle argues that these are expressions of Céline's particular type of French nationalism, which involves heavy criticism of the French and occasionally seems to make Céline argue that he is the last true Frenchman alive. Loselle argues that the Sigmaringen Castle as a setting is highly significant, as it was the seat of the Hohenzollern-Sigmaringen principality and associated with the Franco-Prussian War of 1870–1871, which had spurred anti-German sentiment as a major component of French nationalism. Céline regarded this, along with Germany's defeats in both World War I and World War II, as a major factor that had made a French-German alliance impossible, which he in turn connected to a failure to prevent what he viewed as a downfall of the French on a racial level.

== Reception ==
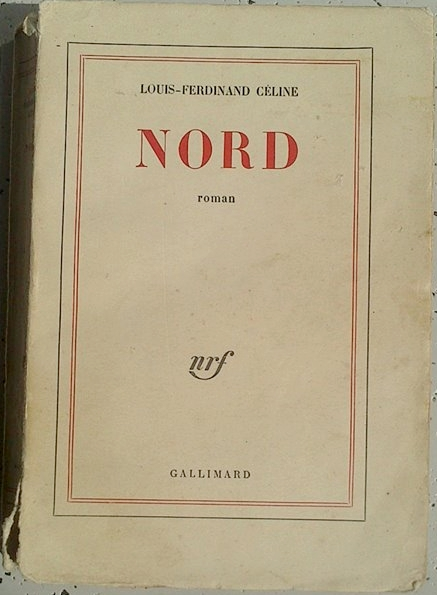
French cover of North, the second book of the trilogy

Like with Céline's post-war works in general, the German trilogy received limited recognition at first, and it was a common view among French literary critics that Céline's talent had been exhausted after Death on Credit from 1936. It gradually came to be regarded in a more positive light as time passed and it became available in new paperback editions. In 1974, it was published in the Bibliothèque de la Pléiade.

Merlin Thomas wrote in his 1980 monograph on Céline that there is "a case" for viewing the German trilogy as "the supreme artistic achievement of Céline". He called the three novels "certainly as good as anything he wrote" and wrote that they "leave an unforgettable impression of the dramatic months before the collapse of Nazi Germany, and also (a major theme, this) of the way in which the individual is reduced to all kinds of humiliating sycophancy when struggling for mere survival".

== Adaptation ==
The 2015 comic book La Cavale du Dr Destouches is loosely based on the German trilogy. It was written by Christophe Malavoy and drawn by Paul and Gaëtan Brizzi.
