= Paschal Grousset =

Paschel Grousset
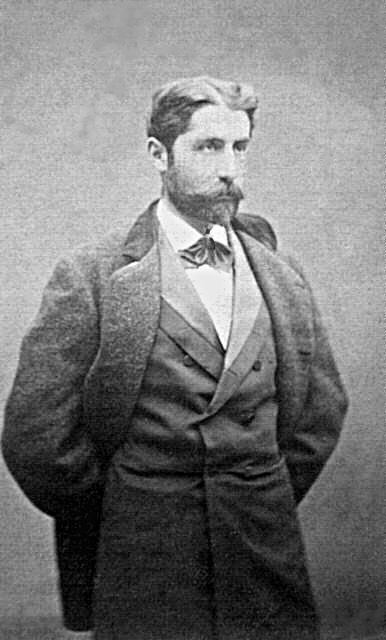

Personal details
- Born: April 7, 1844 Corte, France
- Died: April 9, 1909 (aged 65) Paris, France

Jean François Paschal Grousset (French: [paskal ɡʁusɛ]; 7 April 1844, in Corte – 9 April 1909, in Paris) was a French politician, journalist, translator and science fiction writer. Grousset published under the pseudonyms of André Laurie, Philippe Daryl, Tiburce Moray and Léopold Virey.

== Life and career ==
Grousset was born in Corte, Corsica, and studied medicine before commencing a journalistic career. In 1869 he began working for the weekly newspaper La Marseillaise, writing pro-revolutionary articles. As a result of an attempt by Grousset to challenge Pierre Napoleon Bonaparte to a duel during 1870, Grousset's second, Victor Noir, was shot and killed by Bonaparte during a quarrel. Later the same year Grousset was sentenced to six months imprisonment. He was elected a member of the Paris Commune, becoming a member of its executive committee and Delegate for External Affairs.

After the fall of the Commune, he was arrested and, in 1872, he was deported to New Caledonia. He escaped, and lived in Sydney, San Francisco, New York City and London, making a living by teaching French. He returned to France after the 1880 amnesty, becoming involved in literature and physical culture, but eventually returning to politics and, in 1893, becoming a Socialist Deputy for the 12th arrondissement of Paris.

Like Jules Verne, he was another discovery of publisher Pierre-Jules Hetzel. Two of his manuscripts were modified by Jules Verne to become Les Cinq Cent Millions de la Begum (1879) and L'Étoile du Sud (1884), and credited to Verne. L'Épave du Cynthia (1885) was attributed to both Verne and Laurie; it is entirely Grousset's work.

== Notable works ==
One of Grousset's most notable science fiction novels was Les Exilés de la Terre – Selene-Company Limited (1887). In it, a consortium which intends to exploit the Moon’s mineral resources decides that, since our satellite is too far to be reached, it must be brought closer to the Earth. A Sudanese mountain composed of pure iron ore becomes the headquarters of the newly established Selene Company. Solar reflectors are used to provide the energy required to convert the mountain into a huge electro-magnet, with miles of cables wrapped around it. A spaceship-observatory is then built on top of the mountain. When the experiment begins, the mountain is ripped away from the Earth and catapulted to the Moon. There, the protagonists have various adventures and eventually return to Earth by re-energizing the mountain.

Other notable works by Grousset published under the Laurie pseudonym include De New York à Brest en Sept Heures [New York to Brest in Seven Hours] (1888), which predicted a transatlantic tunnel; Le Secret du Mage (The Secret of the Magician) (1890), in which evidence of an advanced prehistoric is discovered; Le Rubis du Grand Lama [The Ruby of the Great Lama] (1894), which features a steam-powered flying island; Atlantis (1895), which describes how the mythical kingdom has survived under a glass dome at the bottom of the sea near the Azores; Le Maître de l'Abîme (The Master of the Abyss) (1905), which features a revolutionary submarine, and finally Spiridon le Muet (Spiridon The Mute) (1907), a novel about a human-sized, intelligent ant. The character of Spiridon, depicted as a non-human alien, gifted with great knowledge, an insatiable scientific curiosity but no human feelings or emotions, the victim of mankind's petty jealousies and racial fears, is a striking departure from the Vernian influence that permeated the rest of Laurie's works.

== Selected bibliography ==
As Paschal Grousset:

- 1869: Le Rêve d'un Irréconciliable, as Paschal Grousset

As Philippe Daryl:

- 1890: Le Yacht — histoire de la navigation maritime de plaisance https://archive.org/

As André Laurie:

- 1879: Les Cinq Cent Millions de la Begum, written with Jules Verne, translated as The Begum's Fortune by Mrs. Agnes Kinloch Kingston and W. H. G. Kingston (1879), I. O. Evans (1958), and Stanford L. Luce (2005)
- 1882: Mémoires d'un Collégien
- 1884: L'Étoile du Sud, written with Jules Verne, translated as The Vanished Diamond
- 1884: L'Héritier de Robinson (Robinson Crusoe's Heir)
- 1885: L'Épave du "Cynthia", written with Jules Verne, translated as The Waife of the Cynthia in 1886 and as The Salvage of the Cynthia in 1958
- 1886: Le Capitaine Trafalgar
- 1887: Les Exilés de la Terre – Selene-Company Limited, translated as The Conquest of the Moon: A Story of the Bayouda in 1889 (Conquest of the Moon, Black Cat Press, 2010. )
- 1888: De New York à Brest en Sept Heures, translated as New York to Brest in Seven Hours in 1890
- 1890: Le Secret du Mage, translated as The Secret of the Magian or The Mystery of Ecbatana in 1892
- 1891: Axel Eberson, translated as Axel Eberson, the Graduate of Upsala in 1892
- 1894: Le Rubis du Grand Lama (The Ruby of the Great Lama)
- 1895: Un Roman dans la Planète Mars (A Novel On Planet Mars)
- 1895: Atlantis, translated as The Crystal City Under The Sea in 1896 (Crystal City Under the Sea, Black Cat Press, 2010.
- 1903: Le Géant de l'Azur (The Giant of the Azure)
- 1903: Le Filon de Gérard (Gerard's Claim)
- 1903: L'Oncle de Chicago (The Uncle From Chicago)
- 1904: Le Tour du Globe d'un Bachelier (A Graduate Around The World)
- 1905: Le Maître de l'Abîme (The Master of the Abyss)
- 1907: Spiridon le Muet (Spiridon, Adaptation and Introduction by Michael Shreve, Black Coat Press, 2010. ISBN 978-1-935558-61-3)
