= The Church (play) =

1933 play by Louis-Ferdinand Céline

- Original title: L'Église
- Original language: French
- Written by: Louis-Ferdinand Céline
- Characters: Dr. Bardamu
- First publication: 1933
- Genre: satire

Premiere
- Date: 4 December 1936
- Place: Lyon

The Church: A Comedy in Five Acts (French: L'Église. Comédie en cinq actes) is a play by the French writer Louis-Ferdinand Céline. It follows Céline's alter ego Dr. Bardamu in colonial Africa, in the entertainment industry of New York City, at the headquarters of the League of Nations in Geneva, and finally at a small clinic in a Paris suburb. It is a loosely autobiographical satire directed at the League of Nations and colonialism.

Céline wrote The Church in 1926 and it was his first play. It contains many elements that would appear in his debut novel Journey to the End of the Night, published in 1932, which draws from the same personal experiences. A difference is that Journey omits references to the League of Nations. According to Damian Catani, this may be because Céline "got it out of his system" in The Church, because he wanted to avoid too much conflict, or because his work for the organisation did not fit with his growing anti-bourgeoise sentiment.

Denoël & Steele published The Church in 1933. It was first staged in Lyon, playing once on 4 December 1936. François Joxe directed a production that played at the Théâtre des Deux-Portes, Théâtre de la Plaine and Théâtre des Mathurins in 1973.
