= Guignol's Band =

1944 novel by Louis-Ferdinand Céline

- First UK edition
- Author: Louis-Ferdinand Céline
- Translator: Bernard Frechtman; Jack T. Nile
- Cover artist: Wendy Des Moulins (pictured)
- Language: French
- Publisher: Éditions Denoël
- Publication date: April 1944
- Publication place: France
- English publication date: 1954 (New Directions (US), Vision Press (UK)
- Pages: 348

Guignol's Band is a 1944 novel by the French writer Louis-Ferdinand Céline. Set in the mid 1910s, the narrative revolves around Ferdinand, an invalided French World War I veteran who lives in exile in London, and follows his small businesses and interacting with prostitutes. It was followed by a sequel, London Bridge: Guignol's Band II, published posthumously in 1964.

== Writing process ==
Louis-Ferdinand Céline spent a number of months in London after an injury in World War I, and the novel bears some autobiographical elements from that time. The French literature scholar Merlin Thomas wrote in his biography on Céline: "In the chronology of Céline's life as seen through the novels, Guignol's Band should be a massive insert in Voyage, coming immediately before the African section of that work."

== Publication ==
The novel was first published by Éditions Denoël in April 1944 and received very little attention; Céline was highly unpopular at the time, due to his outspoken anti-Semitic stance in combination with the ongoing World War II. It was republished by Éditions Gallimard in 1952, and again did not receive much notice. In 1954 it was published in English.

== See also ==
- 1944 in literature
- 20th-century French literature
