= Fable for Another Time =

1952 novel by Louis-Ferdinand Céline

- First English-language edition
- Author: Louis-Ferdinand Céline
- Original title: Féerie pour une autre fois
- Translator: Mary Hudson
- Language: French
- Publisher: Éditions Gallimard (French); University of Nebraska Press (English)
- Publication date: 27 June 1952
- Publication place: France
- English publication date: 2003
- Pages: 327

Fable for Another Time (French: Féerie pour une autre fois) is a 1952 novel by the French writer Louis-Ferdinand Céline. The narrative recounts Céline's experiences during what seems to be a hypothetical bombing of an area of Montmartre by the allies on the days preceding D-day. The whole of the action of this fairly long narrative lasts no more than twelve hours from the beginning of an evening to the morning after. It was followed by a sequel, Normance, published in 1954.

== Writing process ==
Louis-Ferdinand Céline started to work on the novel in 1945, while he was living in exile in Denmark. At the time he was working on London Bridge: Guignol's Band II, and had plans for a third book in the Guignol's Band series. Those plans were scrapped when Céline was imprisoned, which made him nostalgic about his time in Montmartre. He had also become more concerned about his literary reputation in France; after supporting the Vichy regime during World War II, Céline had been ignored in France, and was almost forgotten as a writer of any relevance. He therefore decided that he had to write a new original work which would make a serious impact. Fable for Another Time was at various times, as is known through Céline's letters, known as La Bataille du Styx ("The battle of Styx"), Du côte des maudits ("The coast of the damned"), Au vents des maudits ("At the winds of the damned"), and Au vents des maudits pour une autre fois ("At the winds of the damned for another time"), before the writer settled on the final title. The book was meant as a fictionalised memoir as much as a defence speech.

== See also ==
- 1952 in literature
- 20th-century French literature
