= Catani (surname) =

Catani is an Italian surname. Notable people with the surname include:

- Carlo Catani (1852–1918), Australian civil engineer
- Claudia Catani (born 1969), Italian actress and voice actress
- Damian Catani (born 1973), literary scholar
- Ina Catani (1906–1938), Swedish archer
- Luigi Catani (1762–1840), Italian painter
- Vittorio Catani (1940–2020), Italian writer
