= Frédéric Vitoux =

Frédéric Vitoux may refer to:

- Frédéric Vitoux (tennis), French tennis player
- Frédéric Vitoux (writer), French novelist
