= Céline: A Biography =

1988 biography of Louis-Ferdinand Céline

- Author: Frédéric Vitoux
- Original title: La Vie de Céline
- Translator: Jesse Browner
- Language: French
- Publisher: Éditions Grasset
- Publication date: 13 January 1988
- Publication place: France
- English publication date: 29 April 1992
- Pages: 596
- ISBN: 9782246351719

Céline: A Biography (French: La Vie de Céline, "the life of Céline") is a 1988 book by the French writer Frédéric Vitoux, on the author Louis-Ferdinand Céline. It was published in English in 1992.

== Reception ==
James Sallis wrote in The Washington Post:

Biographer Vitoux, already a celebrated authority, surely has here the last word on Celine. His book is a marvel of research, of inclusiveness and discursive narration. It is also a marvel of balance, with the biographer, rather like his subject (and for all his obvious passion) standing forever curiously apart from the observing. ... If at the end of Vitoux's watershed work we still fail to know Celine fully, it has nothing to do with Vitoux's labors or insight, and everything to do with the simple fact that finally each of us remains a mystery.

Publishers Weekly wrote: "The book provides a stunning portrait of Celine's progressive withdrawal from reality, accompanied by persecution manias, constant headaches and auditory hallucinations. Vitoux limns a prophet of decadence who hated war and colonialism and rattled the complacency of the well-to-do by proposing that cruel egoism dwells in the heart of every individual." Kirkus Reviews called the book a "sympathetic, perfectly tuned biography of France's most word-wild, controversial novelist ever".

The book received the 1988 Prix de la critique from the Académie Française.
