= The Phantom of the Opera =

The Phantom of the Opera may refer to:

== Novel ==
- The Phantom of the Opera (novel), 1910, by Gaston Leroux

== Characters ==
- Erik (The Phantom of the Opera), the title character of the novel and its adaptations

== Theatre ==
- Phantom of the Opera (1976 musical), adapted by Ken Hill
- The Phantom of the Opera (1986 musical), adapted by Andrew Lloyd Webber
  - The Phantom of the Opera (original London cast recording), 1987 album
  - "The Phantom of the Opera" (song), from the 1986 musical
- Phantom (musical), 1991, adapted by Maury Yeston & Arthur Kopit

== Film and television ==
- The Phantom of the Opera (1925 film), a silent film starring Lon Chaney
- Phantom of the Opera (1943 film), a film starring Claude Rains
- The Phantom of the Opera (1962 film), a British film starring Herbert Lom
- The Phantom of the Opera (1983 film), a 1983 TV film starring Maximilian Schell
- The Phantom of the Opera (1989 film), a film starring Robert Englund
- The Phantom of the Opera (1998 film), an Italian film directed by Dario Argento
- The Phantom of the Opera (2004 film), an adaptation of the Andrew Lloyd Webber musical
  - The Phantom of the Opera (2004 soundtrack), a soundtrack album from the 2004 film
- The Phantom of the Opera (miniseries), a 1990 two-part American TV miniseries starring Charles Dance
- The Phantom of the Opera at the Royal Albert Hall, a 2011 British filmed production of the Andrew Lloyd Webber musical

== Other uses ==
- The Phantom of the Opera (audio drama), a 2007 audio drama for radio, adapted by Barnaby Edwards
- The Phantom of the Opera (pinball), a pinball machine by Data East
- The Phantom of the Opera: A Graphic Novel Adaptation, a 2025 comic book by Paul and Gaëtan Brizzi
- Phantom of the Opera, an album by Wing
- "Phantom of the Opera", a song by Iron Maiden from their 1980 album Iron Maiden
- "Phantom of the Opera", a song by Nightwish from their 2002 album Century Child
- "The Phantom Opera Ghost", a song by Iced Earth from their 2001 album Horror Show
- Phantom of the Opera, a character (based on the 1925 film version) from the theme park attraction Monsters Unchained: The Frankenstein Experiment in Universal Epic Universe

== See also ==
- The Phantom of Hollywood (1974 TV movie), a variation on the theme starring Jack Cassidy on the old MGM studio lot
- The Phantom of the Operetta (disambiguation)
- Phantom (disambiguation)
