= The Barsac Mission =

1919 novel by Jules Verne

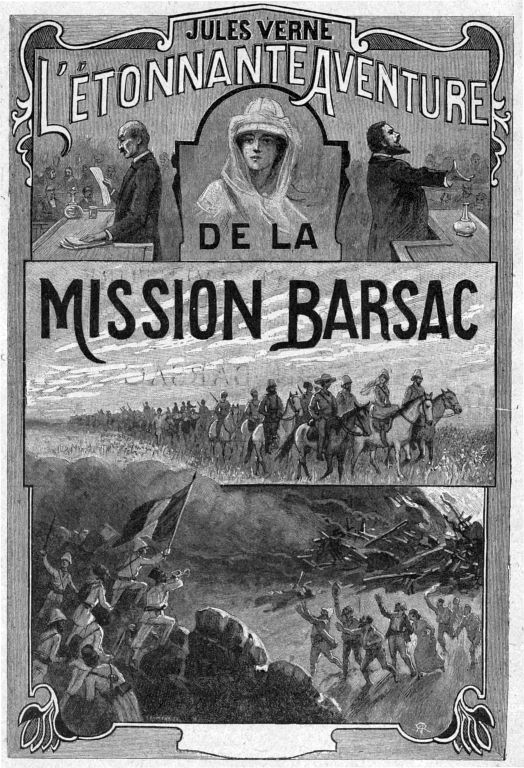
- Frontispiece by George Roux from French edition
- Author: Jules Verne
- Original title: L'Étonnante Aventure de la mission Barsac
- Translator: I. O. Evans
- Illustrator: George Roux
- Language: French
- Series: Voyages extraordinaires
- Genre: adventure; science fiction
- Set in: West Africa
- Published: 1919 (posthumously)
- Publication place: France
- English publication date: 1960
- Preceded by: The Secret of Wilhelm Storitz
- Followed by: Paris in the Twentieth Century

The Barsac Mission (French: L'Étonnante Aventure de la Mission Barsac) is a novel attributed to Jules Verne and written (with inspiration from two unfinished Verne manuscripts) by his son Michel Verne. First serialized in 1914, it was published in book form by Hachette in 1919. An English adaptation by I. O. Evans was published in 1960 in two volumes, Into the Niger Bend and The City in the Sahara. It includes a hidden city, called in English "Blackland", in the Sahara Desert.

Because of Jules Vernes's interest in Esperanto, the original draft, by himself, called "Voyage d'étude", contained references to the language. When his son finished the work, he removed those references.
