= Cannon Fodder (disambiguation) =

Cannon Fodder is a video game series.

Cannon Fodder may also refer to:

- Cannon fodder, a derogatory term used for expendable soldiers
- Cannon Fodder (film), a 2013 Israeli zombie film
- Cannon Fodder (video game), the first game in the series
- Cannon-Fodder, an unfinished novel by Louis-Ferdinand Céline (1894–1961)
- Cannon Fodder, the final segment of Katsuhiro Otomo's 1995 animated film anthology Memories

== See also ==
- Canon Fodder, a 2000 AD comics series
