= Lucette Destouches =

French dancer (1912–2019)

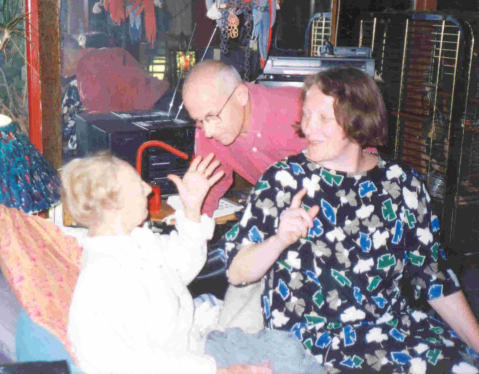
- Destouches (left), François Gibault, and Maroussia Klimova in 1995
- Born: Lucie Almansor; 20 July 1912; Paris, France
- Died: 8 November 2019 (aged 107); Meudon, France
- Occupation: Dancer
- Spouse: Louis-Ferdinand Céline (m. 1943; died 1961)

Lucette Destouches (French pronunciation: [lysɛt detuʃ]; 20 July 1912 – 8 November 2019) was a French dancer. She was married to the writer Louis-Ferdinand Céline until his death in 1961.

== Biography ==
Destouches was the daughter of Joseph Almansor and Gabrielle Donas Lucie Georgette Almansor. She was born on 20 July 1912 in the 5th arrondissement of Paris. Destouches married Louis-Ferdinand Céline on 15 February 1943 in the 18th arrondissement.

During World War II Céline expressed controversial views about the collaborationist regime in France; in September 1944 he and Lucette fled to Germany to escape retaliation. They later moved to Denmark before returning to France.

In his novels, Céline portrayed Destouches as Lili. The character appeared in Castle to Castle, North, and Rigadoon.

Céline died on 1 July 1961, and Destouches largely kept his death a secret. Only thirty people attended the funeral, including Marcel Aymé, Claude Gallimard, Roger Nimier, Robert Poulet, Jean-Roger Caussimon, and Lucien Rebatet.

Destouches began to teach classical dance. She taught courses with Judith Magre, Françoise Gallimard, Isabelle Gallimard, Ludmilla Tchérina, and members of 2Be3 during their early careers.

Destouches was initially quite opposed to Marie Canavaggia's translations and the publications of Rigodoon and anti-Semitic works written by Céline, such as Bagatelles pour un massacre, L'École des cadavres, and Les Beaux Draps, but finally agreed in 2017. The projects were soon postponed indefinitely.

On her 100th birthday in 2012, Destouches had a series of texts by David Alliot written in her honor, titled Madame Céline.

Destouches died on 8 November 2019 at her home in Meudon. She was 107.
