= Don Quixote: A Graphic Novel Adaptation =

2023 comic book by Paul and Gaëtan Brizzi

Don Quixote
- Page count: 200 pages
- Publisher: Daniel Maghen

Creative team
- Writer: Paul and Gaëtan Brizzi, after Miguel de Cervantes
- Artist: Paul and Gaëtan Brizzi

Original publication
- Date of publication: 9 November 2023
- Language: French
- ISBN: 9782356741684

Translation
- Publisher: Abrams ComicArts
- Date: 13 October 2026
- ISBN: 9781419791772

Don Quixote: A Graphic Novel Adaptation (French: Don Quichotte de la Manche) is a 2023 French comic book by Paul and Gaëtan Brizzi. It is based on the novel Don Quixote by Miguel de Cervantes.

The comic book was published by Daniel Maghen on 9 November 2023. Quentin Haegman of Planète BD called it a "great success" with the Brizzis in "great form", writing that their style gives emphasis to the tragicomic aspect of the original novel. Haegman compared their drawings to Gustave Doré's in how they reveal a true love for the adapted work. Kelian Nguyen of ActuaBD also compared it to Doré's illustrations, and wrote that the Brizzis use greyscale and their experience from animated films to achieve "a visual ecstasy that takes the drawings to the edge of life".
