= Journey to the End of the Night =

1932 autofiction novel by Louis-Ferdinand Céline

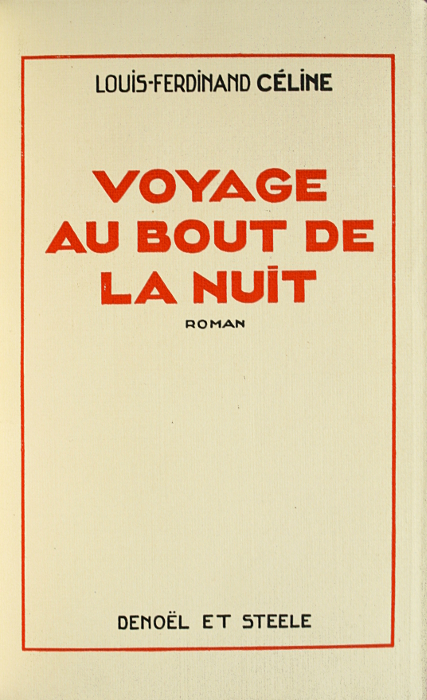
- Cover of the first edition
- Author: Louis-Ferdinand Céline
- Original title: Voyage au bout de la nuit
- Translator: John H. P. Marks (1934), Ralph Manheim (1983)
- Language: French
- Publisher: Denoël et Steele
- Publication date: 1932
- Publication place: France
- English publication date: 1934
- Pages: 623

Journey to the End of the Night (French: Voyage au bout de la nuit, 1932) is the first novel by Louis-Ferdinand Céline. This semi-autobiographical work follows the adventures of Ferdinand Bardamu in World War I, colonial Africa, the United States and the poor suburbs of Paris where he works as a doctor.

The novel won the Prix Renaudot in 1932 but divided critics due to the author's pessimistic depiction of the human condition and his innovative writing style based on working class speech, slang and neologisms. It is now widely considered to be one of the greatest novels of the twentieth century.

== Background ==
Céline began writing Journey to the End of the Night, his first novel, in 1929 while he was working as a doctor in a public clinic in the working class Paris suburb of Clichy. The novel draws on his experience in the French cavalry during World War One, his time in colonial Africa as an employee of a French forestry company, his 1925 visit to the United States as a health officer with the League of Nations, and his experiences as a doctor in Paris. He had used much of this material in a play he wrote in 1926, The Church, which remained unpublished until 1933. A difference between the play and Journey to the End of the Night is that the former makes Céline's work for the League of Nations explicit. The organisation is a major target of the play's satire, with a segment set at its headquarters in Geneva, where Céline had worked until he lost faith in it. According to Damian Catani, the reasons Céline omitted this from the novel may be that he "got it out of his system" in The Church, he wanted to avoid conflict, or his work for the organisation did not fit with his growing anti-bourgeoise sentiment.

Céline completed the novel in late 1931 and submitted it to two small publishers and the major publisher Gallimard, before it was accepted by a fourth publisher, Denoël et Steele, which had recently had a success with Eugène Dabit's L'Hôtel du Nord. Journey to the End of the Night was published in October 1932.

The title stems from the first stanza of the "Beresinalied", a song attributed by the author to the "Swiss Guards (1793)", and whose French translation is the epigraph of Céline's book: «Notre vie est un voyage / Dans l'Hiver et dans la Nuit / Nous cherchons notre passage / Dans le Ciel où rien ne luit» (Our life is a journey / Through Winter and Night; / We look for our way / In a sky without light). (In reality, the Swiss Guards were abolished in France in 1792. The text is from the poem "Die Nachtreise" (1792) by Ludwig Giseke. The poem was later set to music by various composers, and was associated with the French invasion of Russia, in which some Swiss regiments were deployed.)

== Plot summary ==
Ferdinand Bardamu is a young Parisian medical student who, in a fit of enthusiasm, voluntarily enlists in the French army on the outbreak of World War One. During his first engagement with the enemy he decides that the war doesn’t make any sense and he needs to clear out. Alone on a nocturnal reconnaissance mission, he meets a French reservist named Léon Robinson who wants to be captured by the Germans so he can sit out the war in the relative safety of a prisoner of war camp. Bardamu and Robinson make their way to a French town but there are no Germans there to surrender to. Disappointed, they go their separate ways.

Bardamu is wounded in action and receives the médaille militaire. On convalescent leave in Paris, he meets an American volunteer nurse named Lola with whom he has an affair. They visit an amusement park where Bardamu suffers a nervous breakdown at the shooting gallery. He tells Lola that he rejects the war because he doesn't want to die for nothing. Lola tells him he is a coward and leaves him.

Bardamu begins a relationship with Musyne, a violinist. However, she soon leaves him for a succession of rich Argentinians who have profited from the war. He is transferred to a hospital which specialises in electrical therapy and patriotic psychiatry. He is eventually pronounced psychologically unfit for service and discharged from the military.

Bardamu travels to French colonial Africa where he is put in charge of a trading post in the jungle interior. Here he becomes friends with Alcide, his colleague in the French administration. Bardamu finds that the trading post is only a dilapidated hut, and the man he is relieving is Robinson. Robinson tells him that the company cheats its employees and the natives so it is sensible to cheat the company. Robinson sneaks away during the night. After a few weeks, Bardamu catches a fever and sets fire to the trading post in his delirium.

Fearing punishment for defrauding the company, Bardamu decides to flee to the coast. Natives from the nearby village carry Bardamu, who is still delirious, to a Spanish colony where a priest sells him to a ship owner as a galley slave.

The ship sails to New York where Bardamu is put into quarantine until his fever subsides. He talks his way into a job with the quarantine authority and is sent into Manhattan on an errand. He goes in search of Lola and eventually tracks her down. She is now rich and eager to be rid of him. She gives him a hundred dollars and he leaves for Detroit in search of work.

He is employed on the assembly line at Ford Motor Company but finds the work exhausting and dehumanising. He falls in love with a prostitute named Molly who wants him to settle down in America with her but he confesses his mania for escaping from whatever situation he is in. He runs into Robinson and is surprised to learn that he has failed to make anything of himself in America. He decides to return to France and finish his medical training.

Back in Paris, Bardamu completes his medical studies and starts a practice in the bleak (fictitious) suburb of La Garenne-Rancy. The residents are mostly too poor to pay him and he mainly deals with the consequences of botched abortions and takes on hopeless cases which other doctors won't touch. His patients include Madame Henrouille and her husband whose mother-in-law, Grandma Henrouille, lives in a shed behind their house. They want her committed to a mental asylum but Bardamu refuses to help them. They hire Robinson to kill her but the booby trap he prepares for her explodes in his face, blinding him.

In an attempt to hush the scandal, the Henrouilles arrange for Robinson and Grandma Henrouille to manage a mummy exhibit in the crypt of a church in Toulouse. The old woman turns the exhibit into a profitable venture. Robinson, whose eyesight is gradually improving, becomes engaged to a woman named Madelon who sells candles at the church and has been caring for him. Robinson and Madelon plan to murder Grandma Henrouille and take over the exhibit. One night Robinson pushes the old woman down the steep staircase to the crypt, killing her.

Meanwhile, Bardamu finds a job in a lunatic asylum on the outskirts of Paris. The director of the asylum, Dr. Baryton, starts taking English lessons from Bardamu. Moved by the Elizabethan poets and the tragic history of Monmouth the pretender, Baryton loses all interest in psychiatry and leaves for England, putting Bardamu in charge of the asylum. In Baryton's clinic Bardamu has a new affair with Sophie, a nurse from Slovakia.

Robinson meets Bardamu and explains that he has left Madelon and their lucrative job at the crypt because he doesn't want her and her love. Bardamu allows him to stay at the asylum and gives him a menial job. Madelon tracks Robinson down and threatens to turn him in to the police if he doesn't marry her. Sophie suggests that she and Bardamu should go on a double date with Robinson and Madelon in order to reconcile them. The four go to a carnival but during the taxi ride back to the asylum Robinson tells Madelon that he doesn't want to be with her because love disgusts him. They have a violent argument and Madelon shoots Robinson and flees. Robinson dies and Bardamu reflects that he hasn't yet been able to find an idea bigger than death.

== Major themes ==
Journey to the End of the Night reflects a pessimistic view of the human condition in which suffering, old age and death are the only eternal truths. Life is miserable for the poor, futile for the rich, and hopes for human progress and happiness are illusory.

Céline's biographer Patrick McCarthy argues that hate is a central theme of the novel. The Célinian man suffers from an original sin of malicious hatred, but there is no God to redeem him. Hate gives the characters "a concrete, if illusory, reason for their unhappiness." Moreover: "The characteristic trait of Célinian hatred is that it is gratuitous: one does not dislike because the object of dislike has harmed one; one hates because one has to."

War is another major theme. According to Merlin Thomas, Céline presents the horror and stupidity of war as an implacable force which "turns the ordinary individual into an animal intent only on survival". It is the poor who always suffer most. Bardamu sees war as simply a means for the rich to cull the poor.

Céline also explores the theme of survival in a hostile world. Although the Célinian man can't escape his fate, according to McCarthy: "he has some control over his death. He need not be arbitrarily slaughtered in battle and he need not blind himself with divertissements. He can choose to face death, a more painful but more dignified process."

Thomas points out that Bardamu learns that although the poor and weak cannot avoid their fate, they can choose defiance. "If you are weak, then you will derive strength from stripping those you fear of all the prestige they pretend to possess...[T]he attitude of defiance just outlined is an element of hope and personal salvation."

Bardamu also finds some consolation in contemplating human beauty and rare instances of human kindness. Bardamu admires Molly not just for her physical beauty but for her simple generosity. When Alcide volunteers for another stint in colonial Africa in order to pay for the education of his orphaned niece, Bardamu thinks he is acting foolishly, but admires his good intentions.

== Style ==
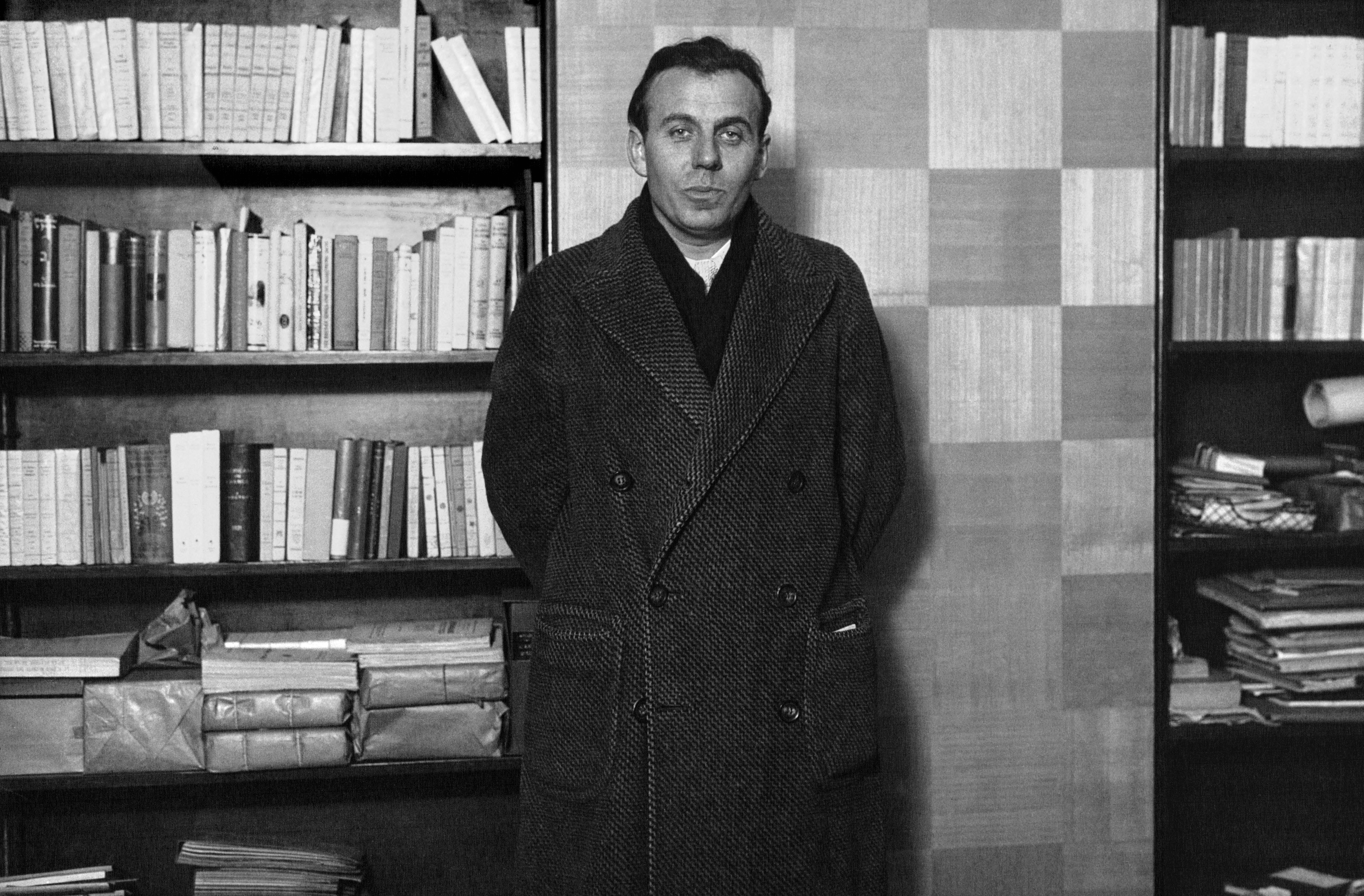
Céline in 1932

In Journey to the End of the Night, Céline developed a unique literary language based on the spoken French of the working class, medical and nautical jargon, neologisms, obscenities, and the specialised slang of soldiers, sailors and the criminal underworld. Reviewing the novel in 1932, a critic for Les Nouvelles littéraires praised its "extraordinary language, the height of the natural and the artificial" while the critic for Le Populaire de Paris condemned it as mere vulgarity and obscenity.

The novel is a first-person narrative. Thomas describes the narrative voice as clinical and detached – the voice of the experienced doctor observing the world through the eyes of his youthful alter ego Bardamu. The clinical tone is frequently associated with sardonic commentary and black humour derived from the futile efforts of characters to control their environment and escape their fate. As McCarthy notes: "It is not just that all men must die, but that each moment of their lives is rendered futile. Everything they do is ridiculous."

The clinical and detached narrative voice occasionally gives way to an hallucinatory delirium. Sometimes this is associated with a fever or psychological stress, sometimes it occurs without apparent cause. Vitoux states: "Delirium is the second state of existence that distances dull, prosaic reality, and an excess of which makes the writer (like his hero) incomparably clear-sighted in the very depths of his misery, enabling him to distinguish the true poetic and convulsive realities contained in life and death."

== Reception and critical reputation ==
Journey to the End of the Night was published in October 1932 to widespread critical attention. The novel attracted admirers and detractors across the political spectrum, with some praising its anarchist, anticolonialist and antimilitarist themes while one critic condemned it as "the cynical, jeering confessions of a man without courage or nobility". The novel was the favourite for the Prix Goncourt of 1932. When the prize was awarded to Guy Mazeline's Les Loups, the resulting scandal increased publicity for Céline's novel, which sold 50,000 copies in the following two months. The novel was awarded the Prix Renaudot in 1932.

Journey to the End of the Night is now considered to be one of the great works of European literature. In 2003 the novel appeared on The Guardian's list of "100 Greatest Novels of All Time". In 1999 it was ranked sixth on Le Monde's list of 100 novels of the twentieth century.

== Adaptations ==
=== Attempts on screen ===
There have been many unfruitful attempts to adapt Journey to the End of the Night for cinema, and it has developed a reputation as unfilmable. During the 1930s, Céline imagined Michel Simon in the role of Bardamu. The director Abel Gance acquired an option for an adaptation on 4 March 1933, but quickly abandoned it, writing in correspondence that it is "currently so difficult to put together film projects with real character".

On 26 June 1933, Céline wrote from Czechoslovakia to Robert Denoël that he had met the film director "Yungbans"—believed to be Carl Junghans—and may be able to convince him to adapt Journey to the End of the Night. The same summer, Céline visited the United States and wrote that he had sold a six-month option for the novel to Lester Yard, and French media reported that Jacques Deval was working on an upcoming Hollywood adaptation. During the same American trip, Céline met the film director Julien Duvivier on board SS Champlain. The two became friends and Duvivier became attached to direct Journey to the End of the Night, acquiring an option and contacting potential financiers.

The director Claude Autant-Lara first tried to make an adaptation in 1937 or 1938. At that time, the publication of Céline's anti-Semitic writings made the project impossible. After Céline's post-war success with Castle to Castle, Autant-Lara revived his plans and met Céline in 1959 or 1960. Céline was positive and said he would like to see the film before he died, even complaining in a letter to Autant-Lara about the lack of progress, and contacting the composer Jean-Claude Descaves to recommend songs that were popular among soldiers in August 1914 and could be used in the soundtrack. Autant-Lara later described the failure to make the film as the greatest regret of his life.

The years after Céline's death in 1961, many filmmakers were to varying degrees attached to adapt Journey to the End of the Night. Among the names that circulated were Jean-Pierre Rassam, Claude Berri, Miloš Forman, René Clément, André Téchiné, Alain Corneau, Roger Vadim and Louis Malle.

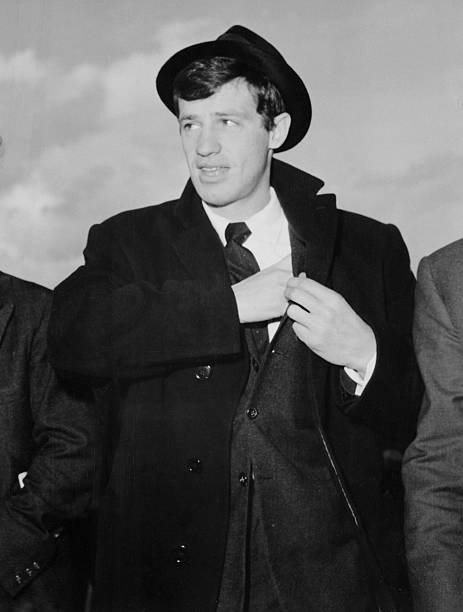
Jean-Paul Belmondo in 1962

In 1964, French media reported that the screenwriter Michel Audiard, who was a great admirer of Céline, had secured the book rights and one billion old francs in funding for a film adaptation. The film was supposed to star Jean-Paul Belmondo as Bardamu and be released the following year. Audiard wanted Federico Fellini as director and Shirley MacLaine for the role of Molly. As the project stalled, Belmondo was able to make Jean-Luc Godard interested in directing. Audiard praised Godard as the only director he had spoken to who truly understood Céline. The project was eventually abandoned, but Godard continued to talk with colleagues for years about vague plans of adapting Céline's novel.

The Italian director Sergio Leone announced in 1975 that he would make a film based on Journey to the End of the Night, but also that it might be a bad idea because the book is too perfect. Sergio Donati and Luciano Vincenzoni suspected that Leone never read the novel and only knew what Vincenzoni had told him about it.

The Swedish filmmaker Roy Andersson holds Journey to the End of the Night as his favourite novel and has at times looked into the possibility of adapting it for cinema. Andersson said in 2015 that he was close 20 years earlier but failed to secure the funding.

François Dupeyron bought the rights to the novel and finished a screenplay draft in 2005. He planned a film adaptation in two parts. After working on it for nine months, he abandoned it due to dissatisfaction with his own script.

In 2017, Canal+ indicated it had plans for an eight-part television adaptation with the involvement of Joann Sfar. Sfar's name resurfaced when he acquired the rights to the novel in 2023.

=== On stage ===
Fabrice Luchini has repeatedly written and performed monologues based on sections of Journey to the End of the Night: one was first performed in 1989–1990 and repeated in 2013–2014, and another was performed in various French cities in 2001–2004. A dialogue by Barnabé Perrotey and François Wastiaux played in Paris in 1989–1993. Julien Bal's play Nuit d'Amérique is based on the chapters set in the Unted States and was produced at the Théâtre du Temps in Paris in 2009–2010. Chloé Desfachelle has adapted the novel into a series of plays starring Antoine Bersoux: Ça a débuté comme ça (2010–2011), L'Apoplexie méridienne (2012–2016) and Qu'on n'en parle plus (2017–2018).

Nicolas Massadau's one-man play starring Jean-François Balmer toured France in 2012–2014. Pascal Francfort's Voyages au bout de la nuit played in Lausanne in 2012–2013. A play by the Collectif Les Possédés starring Rodolphe Dana played in many French cities in 2014–2021. A play based on the opening chapters about World War I, starring Hélène Firla, played at various French locations in 2014–2020. Compagnie 94 produced La Ballade du soldat Bardamu which starred starred Frédéric Polier and played in Geneva in 2017–2018. Théâtre de la Huchette in Paris produced an adaptation written by Philippe del Socorro and starring Franck Desmedt, which after its run in 2018–2019 was staged at various French locations until 2023. Les Amis musiquethéâtre in Carouge produced an adaptation by Felipe Castro in 2024–2026.

Julien Bal created Ça bouge encore (sous mes jambes), a work of dance-theatre based on the novel, which was performed at La Reine Blanche in Paris in 2010–2011. An audiovisual adaptation by SHAM Spectacles, labelled as a remix of the novel, played at the 2012 Festival du Val-d'Oise. The dance show Noir de boue et d'obus, which played in several French locations in 2013–2019, was created by Compagnie Difé Kako and the choreographer Chantal Loïal, and uses Céline's novel as the basis for celebrating the participation of African colonial troops in World War I.

== Publication history ==
- Céline, Louis-Ferdinand (1932). Voyage au bout de la nuit, Paris, Denöel et Steele.
- Céline, Louis-Ferdinand (1934). Journey to the End of the Night. Translated by Marks, J. H. P. London: Chatto and Windus.
- Céline, Louis-Ferdinand (1950). Journey to the End of the Night. Translated by Marks, J. H. P. London: Vision.
- Céline, Louis-Ferdinand (1983). Journey to the End of the Night. Manheim, Ralph (trans.). New York: New Directions. ISBN 978-0-8112-0847-5.
- Céline, Louis-Ferdinand (1988). Journey to the End of the Night. Manheim, Ralph (trans.). London: Calder. ISBN 978-0-7145-4139-6.
- Sturrock, John (1990). Louis-Ferdinand Céline, Journey to the End of the Night. Cambridge: Cambridge University Press. ISBN 0-521-37854-0.
- Céline, Louis-Ferdinand (2006). Vollmann, William T. (afterword) (ed.). Journey to the End of the Night. Translated by Ralph Manheim. New York: New Directions. ISBN 978-0-8112-1654-8.
