= Conversations with Professor Y =

1955 novel by Louis-Ferdinand Céline

- 1986 bilingual edition
- Author: Louis-Ferdinand Céline
- Original title: Entretiens avec le professeur Y
- Translator: Stanford Luce
- Language: French
- Publisher: Éditions Gallimard (French); Brandeis University Press (bilingual)
- Publication date: 1955
- Publication place: France
- English publication date: 1986
- Pages: 153

Conversations with Professor Y (French: Entretiens avec le professeur Y) is a 1955 novel by the French writer Louis-Ferdinand Céline. The narrative focuses on discussions about literature between an author and an academic. The first two thirds of the novel were published in Nouvelle Revue Française in 1954, and the finished work through Éditions Gallimard the following year.

== Reception ==
Nancy Ramsey of The New York Times reviewed the book in 1986, and wrote that "much of Conversations is hilarious. Celine is self-mocking as he tries to get his name back into circulation. He compares an eager genius to the new Big Bubbly soap product, is adamant in his revulsion at the ascendancy of ideas over emotion and is passionate in his desire to capture the immediacy of conversation on the page[.] ... Conversations is essential for Celine fans, and a good, if tame, introduction for the uninitiated."

== See also ==
- 1955 in literature
- 20th-century French literature
