= Normance =

1954 novel by Louis-Ferdinand Céline

- First English-language edition
- Author: Louis-Ferdinand Céline
- Translator: Marlon Jones
- Language: French
- Publisher: Éditions Gallimard (French); Dalkey Archive Press (English)
- Publication date: 25 June 1954
- Publication place: France
- English publication date: 2009
- Pages: 376

Normance is a 1954 novel by the French writer Louis-Ferdinand Céline. The story is a fictionalised version of the author's experiences during the last parts of World War II, where he supported the Nazis. It is the sequel to Céline's 1952 novel Fable for Another Time, and has the subtitle Fable for Another Time II (Féerie pour une autre fois II).

== Reception ==
The book was reviewed in Publishers Weekly in 2009: "Even at his most lucid, Céline's prose reads like rapid bursts of slangy, profane argot—problematic enough in its own right—issued in a dramatic and confrontational style. True to form, this narrative is practically shouted in short exclamation-pointed bursts (connected, or disconnected, as it were, via ellipses)... Truly, there isn't much of a plot, and readers who pick this up are going to pick it up because they're already fans of Céline's work."

== See also ==
- 1954 in literature
- 20th-century French literature
