= Éditions Denoël =

French publishing house

- Parent company: Éditions Gallimard
- Founded: 1930
- Founder: Robert Denoël and Bernard Steele
- Country of origin: France
- Headquarters location: Paris
- Publication types: Books
- Official website: www.denoel.fr

Éditions Denoël is a French publishing house founded in 1930. Acquired by Éditions Gallimard in 1951, it publishes collections spanning fiction, non-fiction and comic books. It published some of the most important French authors of the interwar period, including Louis-Ferdinand Céline, Louis Aragon and Antonin Artaud.

== History ==
In 1930 the Belgian Robert Denoël and the American Bernard Steele (1902–1979) founded Éditions Denoël-Steele, later shortened to Éditions Denoël.^{:228} It had its first success in 1932 with Céline's Voyage au bout de la nuit. Other early success include Louis Aragon's Les Cloches de Bâle (1934), Antonin Artaud's Héliogabale ou l'Anarchiste couronné (1934), and Céline's Mort à crédit (1936).

Denoël can be considered unusual with respect to its diverse choice of publications. Until May 1940, for example, it published an anti-German political magazine as well as the antisemitic pamphlets of Céline and Lucien Rebatet. Bernard Steele left the company because of Céline's pamphlet Mea culpa (1936). Robert Denoël was "openly supportive of Nazi Germany" and the company was known for its collaborationism during the German occupation of Paris. The company received capital from the Germans and published pro-Nazi books, including "anti-Semitic manuals [...], a collection of Hitler's speeches, and the two most famous anti-Semitic literary works of the time: a new edition of Céline's Bagatelles pour un massacre (1937) and Lucien Rebatet's Les Déscombres".^{:161} During those same years, however, they also advertised "well-known authors of the left" and published the works of the Jewish author Elsa Triolet.^{:161}

Denoël was murdered on 2 December 1945 while changing a wheel on his car.^{:xi} The circumstances surrounding his death were mysterious, and it was "possible that he was assassinated for political reasons"; the police officially listed it as a "random crime of violence".^{:xi} Following his death, Denoël's mistress, Jeanne Loviton, became the legal owner of the company.^{:37} In 1951 she sold a 90 percent stake of the company to Gaston Gallimard, "Denoël's archenemy and publishing rival".^{:301}

Nowadays, Éditions Denoël publishes around one hundred titles per year. Among the most famous authors published by Éditions Denoël are Sébastien Japrisot, Jack Kerouac, Norman Mailer, Ray Bradbury, Philip K. Dick, Michael Moorcock and Jeanne Benameur. In 2004, Denoël published Suite française, which became a publishing sensation. The novel won the Prix Renaudot in 2004, the first time the prize was awarded posthumously. From 2006, then editor Olivier Rubinstein also published the literary review Le Meilleur des mondes.
