= Jeanne Benameur =

French woman writer

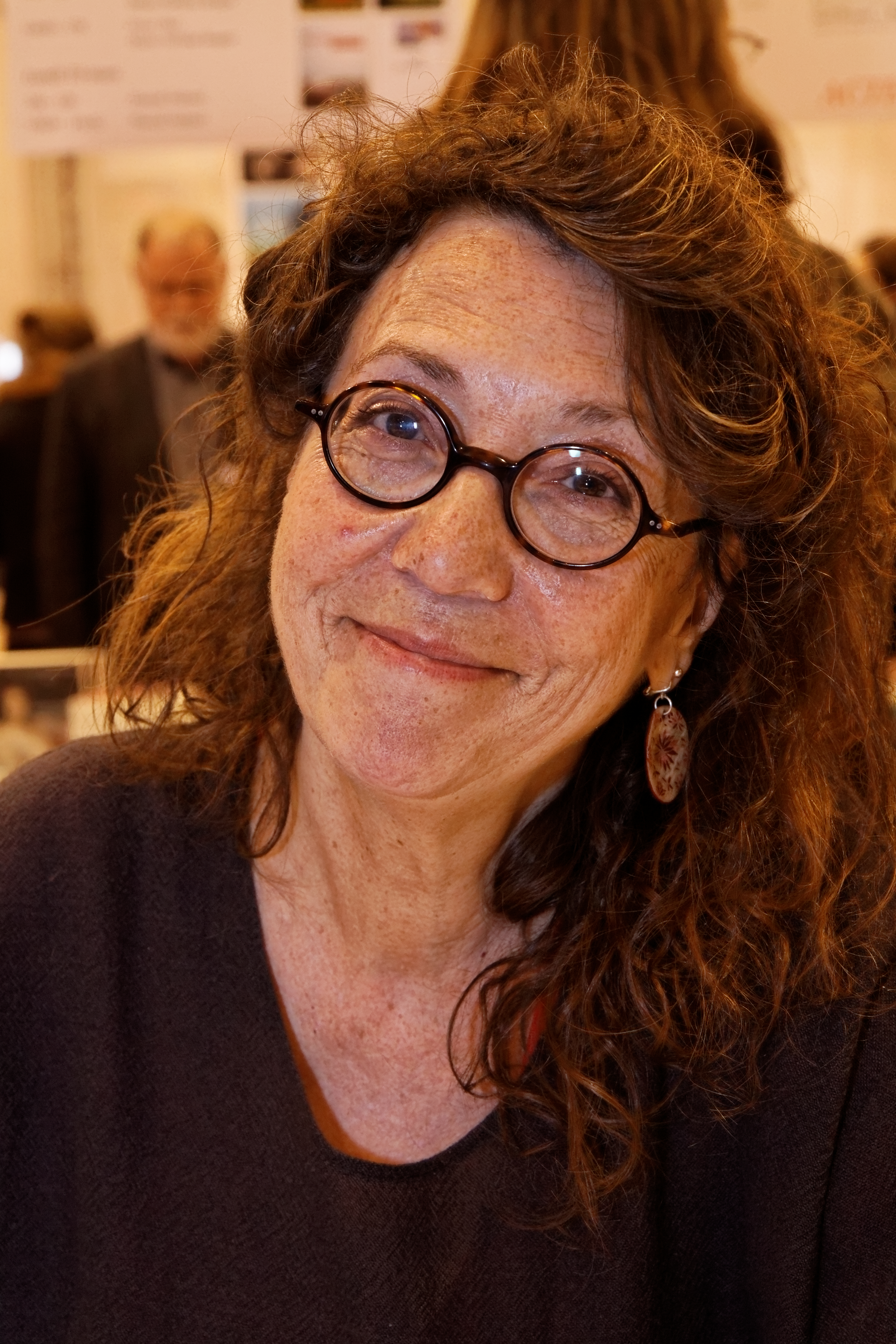
Jeanne Benameur, 2012

Jeanne Benameur (born 1952 in French Algeria) is a French writer. Her father was Algerian and her mother was Italian. The family moved to La Rochelle when Benameur was 5 years old.

A professor of French until 2001, Benameur has published with various publishing houses, most notably Éditions Denoël and Éditions Thierry Magnier. In spite of her multicultural origins (Algerian, Italian, and French), Benameur only writes in French. In 2001, her novel Les Demeurées won the Unicef Prize.

Her autobiography, ça t'apprendra à vivre, was published in 2006.

== Bibliography ==
- Jeanne Benameur (trans. Bill Johnston) The child who (Les Fugitives, 2022)
