= Jerusalem 2111 =

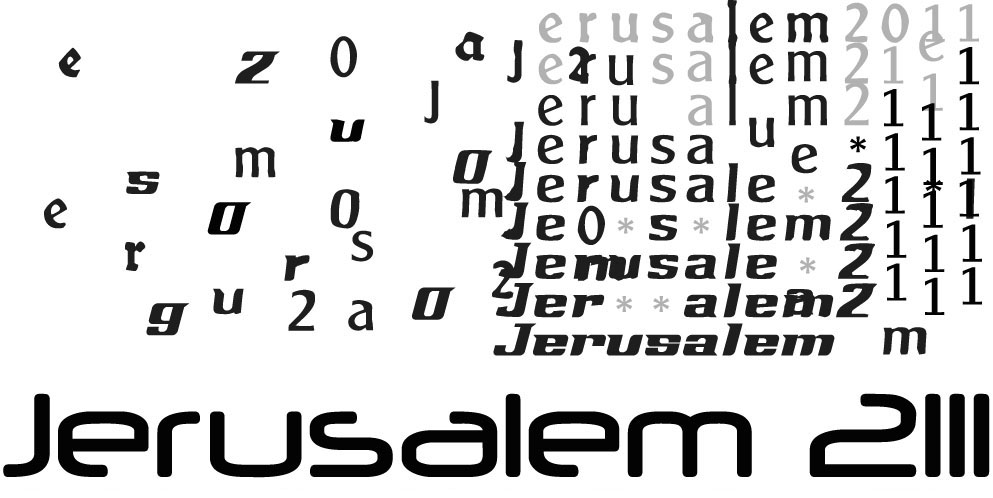

Jerusalem 2111 is an international science fiction contest, created and produced by architect Daniel Wiernik from the Association for Urban Planning, held during 2010 and ending 31 December 2010, a day before the year 2011 (a hundred years before the date that the contest asked for the participants to show). The competition was open to amateur and professional computer graphics and classic animation artists, architects, designers and artists from all over the world.

Following the public on-line vote, an international jury chose the top video clip. The international Jury included among others :

- Jon Landau, Film Producer of Avatar, Titanic.
- Wim Wenders, Film director, playwright, author, photographer and producer.
- Paul and Gaëtan Brizzi, Film directors.

Winner of the $10.000 first prize was Israel-U.S. based cinema student David Gidali, whose 2- minute-long Secular Quarter #3, shows a Jewish couple, religious and non-religious, coming face-to-face as UFOs remove the huge cages sealing off their neighborhoods.
