= Rigadoon (novel) =

1969 novel by Louis-Ferdinand Céline

- 1969 Gallimard edition
- Author: Louis-Ferdinand Céline
- Original title: Rigodon
- Translator: Ralph Manheim
- Language: French
- Publisher: Éditions Gallimard
- Publication date: 1969
- Publication place: France
- English publication date: 1974
- Pages: 323

Rigadoon (French: Rigodon) is a novel by the French writer Louis-Ferdinand Céline, published posthumously in 1969. The story is based on Céline's escape from France to Denmark after the invasion of Normandy, after he had been associated with the Vichy regime. It is the third part in his German trilogy which is about these experiences; it was preceded by Castle to Castle from 1957 and North from 1960.

== Legacy ==
It was also adapted into the 2015 graphic novel La Cavale du Dr Destouches by Paul and Gaëtan Brizzi, along with North and Castle to Castle.

== See also ==
- 1969 in literature
- 20th-century French literature
