= The Phantom of the Opera: A Graphic Novel Adaptation =

2025 comic book by Paul and Gaëtan Brizzi

- Page count: 160 pages
- Publisher: Futuropolis

Creative team
- Writer: Paul and Gaëtan Brizzi, after Gaston Leroux
- Artist: Paul and Gaëtan Brizzi

Original publication
- Date of publication: 15 January 2025
- Language: French
- ISBN: 9782754844529

Translation
- Publisher: Abrams ComicArts
- Date: 6 April 2026
- ISBN: 9781419793950

The Phantom of the Opera: A Graphic Novel Adaptation (French: Le Fantôme de l'Opéra) is a French comic book by Paul and Gaëtan Brizzi. It is based on the 1910 novel The Phantom of the Opera by Gaston Leroux. It was published by Futuropolis on 15 January 2025.

Sébastien Bordenave of Europe 1 called it "an album in grand format that will thrill with its perfect graphic aesthetic". Kelian Nguyen of ActuaBD called it a successful adaptation, with strong character portraits and "captivating immersion" achieved with charcoal and wax-pencil drawings.
