= The Begum's Fortune =

1879 novel by Jules Verne

The Begum's Millions
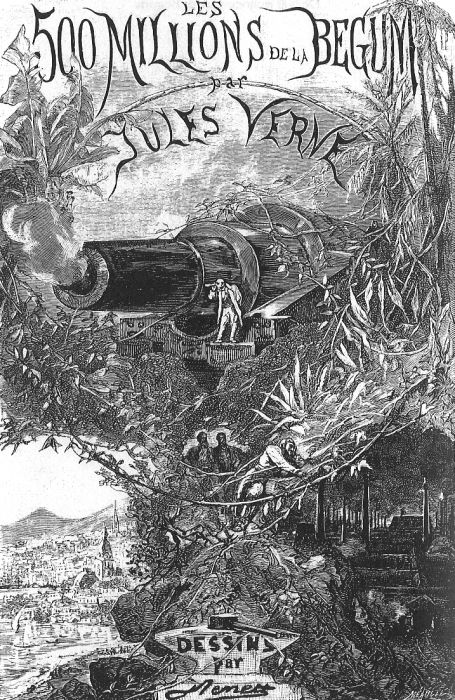
- Author: Jules Verne
- Original title: Les Cinq cents millions de la Bégum
- Translator: Mrs. Agnes Kinloch Kingston and W. H. G. Kingston (1879), I. O. Evans (1958), Stanford L. Luce (2005)
- Illustrator: Léon Benett
- Language: French
- Series: Voyages extraordinaires #18
- Genre: Utopian and dystopian fiction, Science fiction
- Publisher: Pierre-Jules Hetzel
- Publication date: 1879
- Publication place: France
- English publication date: 1879
- Media type: Print (Hardback)
- Preceded by: Dick Sand, A Captain at Fifteen
- Followed by: Tribulations of a Chinaman in China

The Begum's Fortune (French: Les Cinq cents millions de la Bégum, literally "the 500 millions of the begum"), also published as The Begum's Millions, is an 1879 novel by Jules Verne, with some utopian elements and other elements that seem clearly dystopian.

== Plot summary ==
Two men inherit a vast fortune as descendants of a French soldier who settled in India and married the immensely rich widow of a native prince, the begum of the title. One is a French physician, Doctor Sarrasin. The other is a German scientist, Professor Schultze. Each man decides to establish a utopian model city. The United States government cedes to each heir its sovereignty over a tract of land for the creation of his city.

Sarrasin builds Ville-France on the western side of the Cascade Range, with public health as its government's primary concern. Schultze, a militarist and racist, builds Stahlstadt on the east side, a vast industrial and mining complex, devoted to the production of ever more powerful and destructive weapons—and vows to destroy Sarrasin's city.

Most of the action takes place in Stahlstadt, which becomes in a few years the world's biggest producer of arms. Schultze is Stahlstadt's dictator, whose very word is law and who makes all significant decisions personally.

An Alsatian named Marcel Bruckmann relocates to Stahlstadt, and quickly rises high in its hierarchy, gains Schultze's personal confidence, spies out some well-kept secrets, and sends a warning to his French friends. It turns out that Schultze is not content to produce arms, but fully intends to use them first against Ville-France, then establish Germany's worldwide rule.

Two weapons are being produced—a super-cannon capable of firing massive incendiary charges to Ville-France, and shells filled with gas. Schultze's gas is designed not only to suffocate its victims but at the same time also freeze them. Unfortunately for Schultze, the incendiary charge fired by the super-cannon at Ville-France not only renders the cannon unusable but also misses its mark. The charge flies over the city and into space. As Schultze prepares orders for the final assault, a gas projectile in the office accidentally explodes and kills him.

Stahlstadt collapses since Schultze had kept everything in his own hands and never appointed any deputy. It goes bankrupt and becomes a ghost town. Bruckmann and his friend, Dr. Sarrasin's son, take it over. Schultze would remain forevermore in his self-made tomb, on display as he had planned to do to his foes. The good Frenchmen take over direction of Stahlstadt in order to let it "serve a good cause from now on", its arms production being used to defend Ville-France.

== Influence, commentary, and appraisals ==
The book was seen as an early premonition of the rise of Nazi Germany, with its main villain being described by critics as "a proto-Hitler". It reflects the mindset prevailing in France following its defeat in the Franco-German War of 1870–1871, displaying a bitter anti-German bias completely absent from pre-1871 Verne works such as Journey to the Center of the Earth where all protagonists (save one Icelander) are Germans and quite sympathetic ones. In his extensive review of Verne's works, Walter A. McDougall commented with the regard to The Begum's Millions: "After the Franco-Prussian War, Verne began to invent mad scientists and evil geniuses".

Throughout the book, Verne repeatedly ridicules Schultze's racist ideas and their author (the word "Vaterland" in German continually occurs within the French rendering of Schultze's diatribes). As reviewer Paul Kincaid points out, Verne's ridiculing of the German's ethnic stereotyping can be regarded as itself part of an ethnic stereotyping in the opposite direction.

At the time of writing, public opinion in France was moved by the liberal subscriptions made by the citizens of San Francisco to a relief fund for the sick and wounded soldiers of France during the Franco-Prussian war. In acknowledgement, the French government donated to the newly established San Francisco Art Association a collection of copies from original marbles in the Louvre, including twenty-five pieces of the Parthenon frieze.

Researcher George Klein noted that "The Begum's Fortune shares its main theme with Verne's Facing the Flag (Original French title: Face au drapeau), published in 1896: French patriotism faced with the threat of futuristic super-weapons (what would now be called weapons of mass destruction) and emerging victorious".

== Film adaptations ==
- Tajemství Ocelového města (The Secret of Steel City), a 1979 film made in Czechoslovakia, directed by Ludvík Ráža.

== See also ==
- Memories (1995 film); the third part, "Cannon Fodder", has some similarities
- "Sultana's Dream", a 1905 utopian feminist Bengali science fiction short story by Begum Rokeya Sakhawat Hussain
