= North (novel) =

1960 novel by Louis-Ferdinand Céline

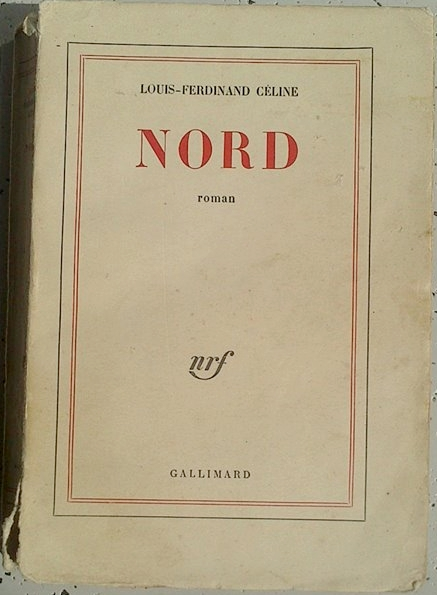
- Author: Louis-Ferdinand Céline
- Original title: Nord
- Translator: Ralph Manheim
- Language: French
- Publisher: Éditions Gallimard
- Publication date: 1960
- Publication place: France
- English publication date: 1972
- Pages: 448

North (French: Nord) is a 1960 novel by the French writer Louis-Ferdinand Céline. The story is based on Céline's escape from France to Denmark after the invasion of Normandy, after he had been associated with the Vichy regime. It is the second published part, although chronologically the first, in Céline's German trilogy which is about these experiences; it was preceded by Castle to Castle from 1957, and followed by Rigadoon, published posthumously in 1969. It was the last book Céline published during his lifetime.

== Publication ==
The book was published in 1960 through Éditions Gallimard. In the first edition, some of the characters have the same names as the real people who inspired them. Because of this, Céline was sued for defamation, and in subsequent editions all characters have fictional names.

== Legacy ==
It was also adapted into the 2015 graphic novel La Cavale du Dr Destouches by Paul and Gaëtan Brizzi, along with Castle to Castle and Rigadoon.

== See also ==
- 1960 in literature
- 20th-century French literature
