= Dante's Inferno: A Graphic Novel Adaptation =

2023 comic book by Paul and Gaëtan Brizzi

Dante's Inferno (L'Enfer de Dante)
- Page count: 160 pages
- Publisher: Daniel Maghen

Creative team
- Writer: Dante Alighieri
- Artist: Paul and Gaëtan Brizzi

Original publication
- Date of publication: 19 January 2023
- Language: French
- ISBN: 9782356741349

Translation
- Publisher: Abrams ComicArts
- Date: 20 November 2024
- ISBN: 9781419776755

Dante's Inferno: A Graphic Novel Adaptation (French: L'Enfer de Dante) is a comic book based on Dante Alighieri's poem Inferno. It was made by the Frenchmen Paul and Gaëtan Brizzi and published by Daniel Maghen on 19 January 2023. Abrams ComicArts published it in English on 20 November 2024.
