= Paul and Gaëtan Brizzi =

French artists

- Born: 24 December 1951 (age 74); Paris

Paul and Gaëtan Brizzi (born 24 December 1951 in Paris, France) are twin French artists, painters, illustrators, animators and film directors.

== Career ==
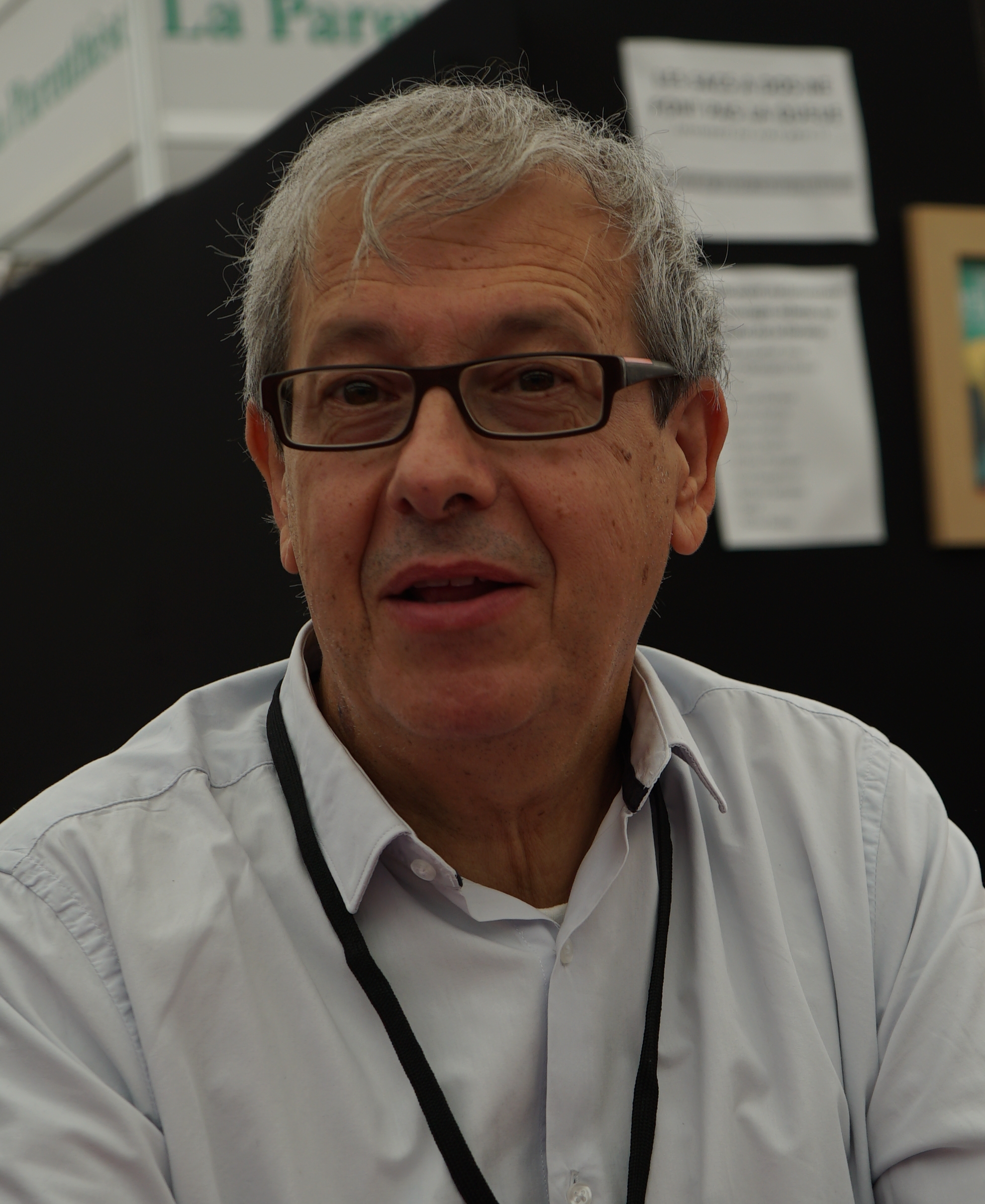

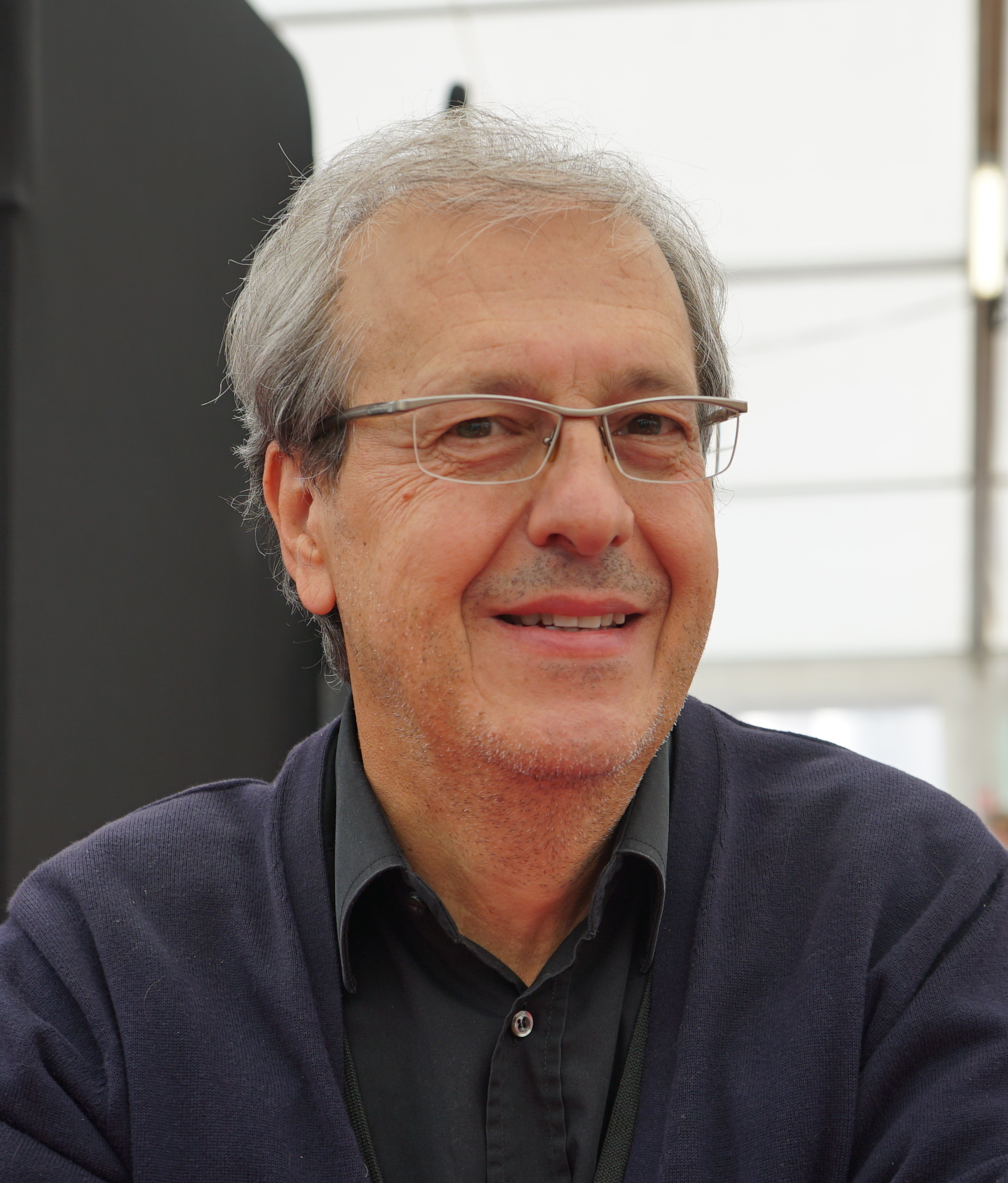

The Brizzis first made their name working in commercials and short films, including the award-winning short Fracture. In 1985, the brothers directed the animated film Asterix Versus Caesar (Astérix et la surprise de César) for Gaumont, and started their own animation studio, Brizzi Films, the following year. Brizzi Films worked on several international television series, including Babar and its feature film adaptation, Babar: The Movie (1989). In 1989, the Brizzis sold their studio to The Walt Disney Company, who first turned the facility into a satellite shop for Walt Disney Television Animation. The Brizzis worked as unit producers on several Disney TV shows and two films based on Disney TV shows, DuckTales the Movie: Treasure of the Lost Lamp (1990) and A Goofy Movie (1995).

In 1994, Walt Disney Animation France was placed under the Walt Disney Feature Animation division, and after completing work on A Goofy Movie, the Brizzis moved to Los Angeles to work as storyboard/concept artists and sequence directors on The Hunchback of Notre Dame (1996). They also worked extensively on Tarzan (1999), and developed and directed the Firebird Suite sequence in Fantasia 2000 (1999).

The Brizzis left Disney in 2001, and the studio in France was closed down in 2002 during a massive downsizing of Feature Animation. The brothers continued to work on their personal art and painting projects, and were briefly signed to direct Cloudy with a Chance of Meatballs and Surf's Up at Sony Pictures Animation. Following work as story artists on the Tim Burton-produced 9, the brothers had been working with Mick Jagger on a film entitled Ruby Tuesday, which will present animated interpretations of songs by Jagger's band The Rolling Stones.

In 2015, they released the comic book La Cavale du Dr Destouches, which they made in collaboration with Christophe Malavoy. The comic is based on Louis-Ferdinand Céline's novels Castle to Castle, North and Rigadoon, which form a trilogy about his experiences from the Sigmaringen Castle enclave during World War II.

In 2023, they published Dante's Inferno: A Graphic Novel Adaptation, a comic book based on Dante Alighieri's poem Inferno.

== Selected filmography ==
- Fracture (1977, short) – directors
- Chronique 1909 (1982)
- Asterix Versus Caesar/Astérix et la surprise de César (1985) – directors
- Babar (1989, television series) – Unit producers
- Babar: The Movie (1989) – Unit directors
- DuckTales the Movie: Treasure of the Lost Lamp (1990) – Unit producers
- TaleSpin (1990, television series) – Unit producers
- Winnie the Pooh and Christmas Too – Unit producers
- A Goofy Movie (1995) – Unit producers, sequence directors
- The Hunchback of Notre Dame (1996) – storyboard artists, visual development, sequence directors
- Tarzan (1999) – storyboard artists, visual development
- Fantasia 2000 (1999) – storyboard artists, visual development, directors: Firebird Suite
- Enchanted (2007) – storyboard artists
- 9 (2009) – storyboard artists
- Kahlil Gibran's The Prophet (2015) – storyboard artists, segment directors
- Space Jam: A New Legacy (2021) - storyboard artists

== Selected bibliography ==
- La Cavale du Dr Destouches (2015), Futuropolis
- L'Automne à Pékin (2017), Futuropolis
- Les Contes Drolatiques (2021), Futuropolis
- L'Enfer de Dante (2023), Daniel Maghen; in English in 2024 as Dante's Inferno: A Graphic Novel Adaptation
- Don Quichotte de la Manche (2023), Daniel Maghen; in English in 2026 as Don Quixote: A Graphic Novel Adaptation
- Le Fantôme de l'Opéra (2025), Futuropolis
- Macbeth (2025), Daniel Maghen
- Le Horla (2026), Futuropolis

== See also ==
- Jerusalem 2111
- Walt Disney Animation France
