= Guy Mazeline =

French writer (1900–1996)

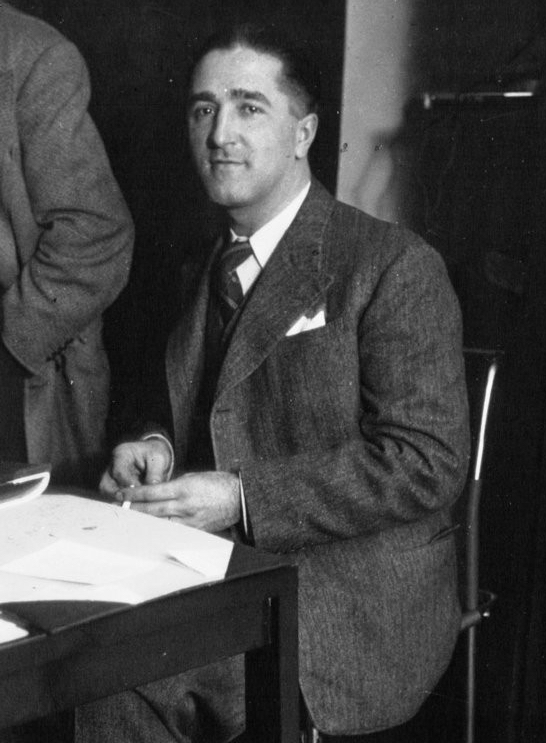
- Mazeline in 1932
- Born: 12 April 1900; Le Havre, Normandy, France
- Died: 25 May 1996 (aged 96); Boulogne-Billancourt, Île-de-France, France
- Occupation: Writer
- Spouse: Claire Louise Dors (m. 1924)
- Parent(s): Alphonse Mazeline; Elise Hélène Suzanne Jaquereau
- Writing career
- Notable awards: Prix Goncourt (1932)

Guy Mazeline (12 April 1900 Le Havre – 25 May 1996 Boulogne-Billancourt) was a French writer, winner of the prix Goncourt in 1932 for his novel Les Loups, surprisingly winning against Voyage au bout de la nuit by Louis-Ferdinand Céline.

He is the son of Alphonse Mazeline and Elise Hélène Suzanne Jaquereau. He married on 18 December 1924, to Claire Louise Dors (7 June 1901 Nevers).

== Works ==
- Piège du démon, 1927
- Porte close, 1928
- Un royaume près de la mer, 1931
- Les Loups, 1932
- Le Capitaine Durban, 1934
- Le Délire, 1935
- Les Îles du matin, 1936
- Bêtafeu, 1937
- Le Panier flottant, 1938
- Scènes de la vie hitlérienne, 1938
- Pied d'alouette, 1941
- La Femme donnée en gages, 1943
- Tony l'accordeur, 1943
- Un dernier coup de griffe, 1944
- Le Souffle de l'été, 1946
- Valfort, 1951
- Chrétienne compagnie, 1958
- Un amour d'Italie, 1967

== Les Loups/The Wolves (Synopsis) ==
Maximilien Jobourg is the lead protagonist. Due to inheriting his father's business, initially he lives comfortably with his wife Marie-Jeanne and his children Didier (who aspires to be a sailor), Vincent (who is disabled after a childhood accident affected one of his legs), Benoît (who is impulsive, violent and hires prostitutes regularly), Geneviève (who's the fiancee of the wealthy Gilbert), and Blanche (who's married to her banker husband Georges, whom Vincent and Benoit privately refer to as the 'Hypocrite', due to his ambition and duplicity. Blanche and Georges still live in the family home).

Maximilien has become jaded with the shallow Marie-Jeanne, who is obsessed with appearances, and who worries that her husband has little business acumen. His mother Virginie detests Marie-Jeanne due to her working class origins. Marie Jeanne and Virginie are estranged from one another due to this mutual distrust. Virginie also seems to loathe Maximilien too, as she connives with Georges to bankrupt him by persuading him to invest in worthless shares. Maximilien is no judge of human character and cannot detect the duplicity of his son-in-law, assuming that given their family relationship, Georges would not deceive him in financial matters.

Maximilien's niece Valérie appears in Le Havre. Valérie, however, is Maximilien's illegitimate daughter, the child his lover Pauline bore after she left Le Havre for Martinique twenty years before, when she married Labrête. Valérie was brought up as the child of Pauline and her husband. But discovering the truth that Valerie is not his daughter, Labrête drowns himself. Now dying herself, Pauline has sent Valérie to her 'uncle' Maximilien in Le Havre. Maximilien conceals her presence in a servant's home but comes to love her more than his other, legitimate children from his marriage to Marie-Jeanne.

Valérie learns that Maximilien is her real father. She cannot live with the deceptive nature of her previous life and commits suicide with an 'ornamental' weapon that Maximilien provided inadvertently within her room. Traumatised by Valerie's death, Maximilien lines his trouser pockets with rocks and drowns himself at sea.

== Critical Response to Les Loups ==
According to one reviewer, Tony Shaw, Les Loups was condemned as overly lengthy, 'unreadable' and dull in Figaro and Le Parisien even in 1999, which indicates that there is still critical opinion that Journey to the End of Night should have won the prix Goncourt in 1932 instead. French critic Eugene Saccomano novelised the consequent debate over the relative merits of The Wolves and Journey to the End of Night, in a book entitled Goncourt '32. In 2017, Les Loups was cited as a "literary Atlantide" in a French critical collection that assessed the posthumous oblivion that has attended the novel, its author's legacy and several other French 'forgotten authors ', some of whom also previously received the prix Goncourt

Les Loups has not been republished in English since 1935, or in French since 1951, according to bibliographic data. It became available in microfilm format in 1989.

None of Mazeline's other work is available in English translation.

=== English Translations ===
- The wolves; translated from the French by Eric Sutton. New York, The Macmillan company, 1934.
