= Cannon-Fodder =

Unfinished novel by Louis-Ferdinand Céline

- First English-language edition
- Author: Louis-Ferdinand Céline
- Original title: Casse-pipe
- Translator: Kyra De Coninck; Billy Childish
- Language: French
- Publisher: Editions Frédéric Chambriand (French); Hangman Books (English)
- Publication date: 1949
- Publication place: France
- English publication date: 1988

Cannon-Fodder (French: Casse-pipe) is an unfinished novel by the French writer Louis-Ferdinand Céline. The largely autobiographical narrative is set before World War II, and roughly continues where Céline's 1936 novel Death on Credit ended. Much of the novel disappeared in 1944. Surviving fragments have been published from 1948 and onward, the main part in book form in 1949.

== See also ==
- 20th-century French literature
