= Stanford Luce =

Stanford Leonard Luce Jr
- Born: May 19, 1923; Boston, Massachusetts
- Died: March 26, 2007 (aged 83); Cincinnati, Ohio
- Occupations: Professor of French at Miami University in Oxford, OH

Stanford Leonard Luce Jr (May 19, 1923 – March 26, 2007) was an American academician known for his work on Louis-Ferdinand Céline and for his English translations of Jules Verne books, especially The Kip Brothers and The Mighty Orinoco, which he was the first to translate into English.

== Biography ==
Luce was born in Boston, Massachusetts, the son of Agnes Foote Luce and Stanford L. Luce Sr. He received a Ph.D. in French studies from Yale University. He died at the age of 83 in Cincinnati, Ohio.

== Works ==
- Jules Verne, moralist, writer, scientist (1953), first English Ph.D. dissertation on Jules Verne, Yale University
- A Glossary of Céline's Fiction, with English Translations (1979), Quality Books, ISBN 978-0-89196-057-7
- A Half-century of Céline: An Annotated Bibliography, 1932-1982 with William K. Buckley (1983), Garland Pub., ISBN 978-0-8240-9191-0
- Céline and His Critics: Scandals and Paradox (1986), Anma Libri, ISBN 978-0-915838-59-2
- Celine's Pamphlets: An Overview (199*), self-published, OCLC 82916731

=== Translations ===
- Jules Verne, The Mighty Orinoco (French: Le Superbe Orénoque), with Arthur B. Evans, Walter James Miller (2002), Wesleyan University Press, ISBN 978-0-8195-6511-2
- Jules Verne, The Begum's Millions (French: Les Cinq Cents Millions de la Bégum), with Arthur B. Evans and Peter Schulman (2005), Wesleyan University Press, ISBN 978-0-8195-6796-3
- Louis-Ferdinand Céline, Conversations with Professor Y (French: Entretiens avec le professeur Y) (2006), Dalkey Archive Press, ISBN 978-1-56478-449-0
- Jules Verne, The Kip Brothers (French: Les Frères Kip), with Arthur B. Evans and Jean-Michel Margot (2007), Wesleyan University Press, ISBN 978-0-8195-6704-8
