= Death on Credit =

1936 novel by Louis-Ferdinand Céline

- 1938 English-language translation (publ. Chatto & Windus, UK)
- Author: Louis-Ferdinand Céline
- Original title: Mort à crédit
- Translator: John H. P. Marks (1938), Ralph Manheim (1966)
- Language: French
- Publication date: 1936
- Publication place: France
- ISBN: 978-1-84749-041-4
- OCLC: 228581886

Death on Credit (French: Mort à crédit, US translation: Death on the Installment Plan) is a novel by author Louis-Ferdinand Céline, published in 1936. The most common, and generally most respected English translation is Ralph Manheim's.

== Contents ==
In Death on Credit, Ferdinand Bardamu, the alter ego Céline also used in Journey to the End of the Night—to which it is a sort of prequel—is a doctor in Paris, treating the poor who rarely pay him, but take every advantage of his availability. The action is not continuous, but goes back in time to earlier memories and often moves into fantasy, especially in Ferdinand's sexual escapades. The style becomes deliberately rougher and sentences become terser to emulate everyday Parisian tragedies: struggles to make a living, illness, venereal disease, the stories of families whose destiny is governed by their own stupidity, malice, lust and greed.

The novel brings to life a gallery of failures and misfits, including Gorloge, Mr. Merrywin, the author's parents, and the inventor Roger-Marin Courtial des Pereires and his wife. Courtial, an extravagant but universal scholar, and a figure at the same time brilliant and grotesque, is inspired by Raoul Marquis (better known as Henry de Graffigny), whom Céline met at the end of World War I, when both were hired by the Rockefeller Foundation and traveled together to Brittany for the campaign against tuberculosis.
