= Castle to Castle =

1957 novel by Louis-Ferdinand Céline

- First US edition (1968)
- Author: Louis-Ferdinand Céline
- Original title: D'un château l'autre
- Translator: Ralph Manheim (1968)
- Cover artist: Paul Bonet
- Language: French
- Genre: Novel
- Publisher: Gallimard (France); Delacorte Press (US)
- Publication date: 12 June 1957
- Publication place: France
- English publication date: 1968
- Media type: Print (hardcover & paperback)
- Pages: 315
- ISBN: 978-2-07-021310-8

Castle to Castle (French: D'un château l'autre) is a 1957 novel by Louis-Ferdinand Céline. The book features Céline's experiences in exile with the Vichy French government at Sigmaringen, Germany, towards the end of World War II. One of the characters which appears is the actor Robert Le Vigan, a close friend. It is the first book in Céline's German trilogy and was followed by North and Rigadoon.

For the first U.S. edition, translator Ralph Manheim won the 1970 National Book Award in category Translation.

It was adapted into the 2015 graphic novel La Cavale du Dr Destouches by Paul Brizzi and Gaëtan Brizzi, along with North and Rigadoon.
