= Ferdinand Bardamu =

Book character by Louis-Ferdinand Céline

Ferdinand Bardamu is the protagonist of several works by the French writer Louis-Ferdinand Céline, most notably the 1932 novel Journey to the End of the Night (Voyage au bout de la nuit) and the 1936 novel Death on Credit (Mort à crédit). The novels cover Bardamu's travels and experiences in a series of roles and professions: as a medical student, a voluntary soldier in World War I, a factory clerk in colonial Africa, an assembly-line worker for Ford in Detroit, a doctor for the poor in a Paris suburb, a theatre extra, and an employee and eventually director at a psychiatric hospital.

The hero's first name, Ferdinand, is shared with Céline, the author/narrator for whom he acts as a surrogate.^{[a]} His surname, Bardamu, is derived from the French words Barda—the "pack" carried by World War I soldiers—and mu, the past participle of the verb mouvoir, meaning to move. As Journey to the End of the Night progresses, circumstances compel Bardamu to give up his "baggage" of conventional morality and the optimism of youth.

== Footnotes ==
^aThe two would later be combined as "Louis Ferdinand Bardamu" by the narrator Raphael of Modiano's La Place de L'étoile (1968).
