= Jesse Browner =

American writer

Jesse Browner (born March 30, 1961) is an American novelist, essayist, and translator. His work has appeared in Nest, Food & Wine, Gastronomica, New York, The New York Times Book Review and Poets & Writers. His books have been published in the United States, France, Italy, Poland, Germany and the Netherlands.

== Life ==
Browner was born in New York City and grew up there and in Europe. He is a 1983 graduate of Bard College, where he earned a B.A. in English. He is married to notable book editor and publisher Judy Clain with whom he shares two daughters.

== Books ==
- Conglomeros, Random House, 1992 (ISBN 978-0-6794-0879-6)
- Turnaway, Random House, 1996 (ISBN 978-0-5171-9765-3)
- The Duchess Who Wouldn't Sit Down, Bloomsbury, 2003 (ISBN 978-1-4223-5500-8)
- The Uncertain Hour, Bloomsbury, 2007 (ISBN 978-1-5969-1339-4)
- Everything Happens Today, Europa, 2011 (ISBN 978-1-6094-5051-9)
- How Did I Get Here, HarperCollins, 2015 (ISBN 978-0-0622-7572-1)
- Sing to Me, Little, Brown, 2025 (ISBN 978-0316581233)

== Translations ==
- Diary of an Unknown, Jean Cocteau, Paragon House, 1988 - (ISBN 978-1-5692-4983-3)
- Oriental Metaphysics, René Guénon, Hanuman Books, 1989 - (ISBN 978-0-9378-1524-3)
- Letters to Merline, Rainer Maria Rilke, Paragon House, 1989 - (ISBN 978-1-5577-8115-4)
- Letter to Gala, Paul Eluard, Paragon House, 1989 - (ISBN 978-1-5577-8119-2)
- Souvenir Portraits, Jean Cocteau, Paragon House, 1989 - (ISBN 978-1-5692-4961-1)
- Celine: A Biography, Frederic Vitoux, Paragon House, 1992 - (ISBN 978-1-5692-4888-1)
- The Bad Life, Frédéric Mitterrand, Soft Skull, 2010 - (ISBN 978-1-5937-6260-5)
- Happiness: A Guide to Developing Life's Most Important Skill, Matthieu Ricard, Little Brown, 2011 - (ISBN 978-0-3161-6725-3)
- Monsieur le Commandant, Romain Slocombe, Gallic Books, 2013 - (ISBN 978-1-9083-1350-8)
