= Frédéric Vitoux (writer) =

French writer and journalist (born 1944)

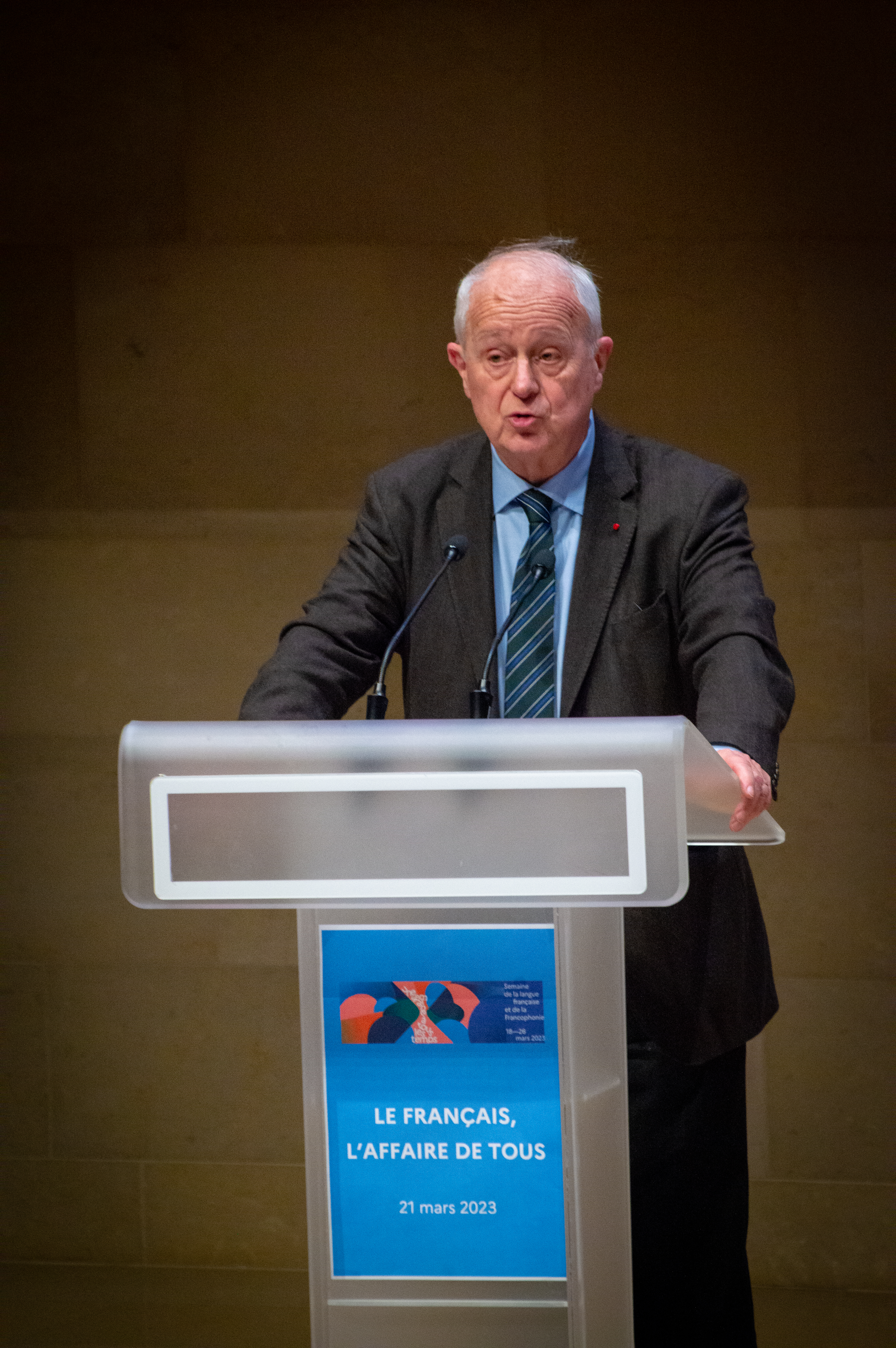
- Vitoux in 2023
- Born: Frédéric Louis Jean Vitoux; 19 August 1944 (age 82); Vitry-aux-Loges, France
- Education: Lycée Charlemagne
- Occupations: Writer; Journalist
- Known for: Member of the Académie Française (2001–present)

Frédéric Louis Jean Vitoux (French pronunciation: [fʁedeʁik vitu]; born 19 August 1944) is a French writer and journalist. He is known as a novelist, biographer and literary columnist. His father was also a journalist.

Vitoux was elected to the Académie Française in 2001. In 1994 he won the Grand Prix du roman de l'Académie française for La Comédie de Terracina. In 2010, he won the Édouard Drumont literary prize for his novel Grand Hôtel Nelson.

== Bibliography ==
- 1973 Louis-Ferdinand Céline, Misère et parole (Éditions Gallimard)
- 1973 Cartes postales (Gallimard)
- 1976 Les Cercles de l'orage (Grasset)
- 1976 Bébert, le chat de Louis-Ferdinand Céline (Grasset)
- 1978 Yedda jusqu'à la fin (Grasset)
- 1978 Céline (Belfond)
- 1979 Un amour de chat (Balland)
- 1981 Mes îles Saint-Louis (Le Chêne)
- 1982 Gioacchino Rossini (Le Seuil)
- 1983 Fin de saison au Palazzo Pedrotti (Le Seuil)
- 1985 La Nartelle (Le Seuil)
- 1986 Il me semble désormais que Roger est en Italie (Actes-Sud)
- 1987 Riviera (Le Seuil)
- 1988 La Vie de Céline (Grasset)
- 1990 Sérénissime (Le Seuil)
- 1990 L'Art de vivre à Venise (Flammarion)
- 1992 Charles et Camille (Le Seuil)
- 1993 Paris vu du Louvre (A. Biro)
- 1994 La Comédie de Terracina (Le Seuil)
- 1996 Deux femmes (Le Seuil)
- 1998 Esther et le diplomate (Le Seuil)
- 2000 L'ami de mon père (Le Seuil)
- 2001 Le Var pluriel et singulier (Équinoxe)
- 2003 Des dahlias rouge et mauve (Le Seuil)
- 2004 Villa Sémiramis (Le Seuil)
- 2005 Le roman de Figaro (Fayard)
