= La Cavale du Dr Destouches =

2015 comic book by Paul and Gaëtan Brizzi

- Date: 10 September 2015
- Page count: 96 pages
- Publisher: Futuropolis

Creative team
- Writer: Christophe Malavoy
- Artists: Paul and Gaëtan Brizzi

Original publication
- Language: French
- ISBN: 9782754811736

La Cavale du Dr Destouches (lit. 'The Escape of Dr. Destouches') is a 2015 French comic book with scenario by Christophe Malavoy and art by Paul and Gaëtan Brizzi. It is about the writer Louis-Ferdinand Céline and his time with his wife Lucette and cat Bébert at the Sigmaringen enclave, where leaders and collaborators of Vichy France gathered in 1944.

The book is loosely based on Céline's novel trilogy about these events. It was published by Futuropolis on 10 September 2015.
