= London Bridge: Guignol's Band II =

1964 novel by Louis-Ferdinand Céline

- First English-language edition
- Author: Louis-Ferdinand Céline
- Original title: Le Pont de Londres
- Translator: Dominic Di Bernardi
- Language: French
- Publisher: 20 March 1964 Éditions Gallimard; 1995 Dalkey Archive Press
- Publication place: France
- Pages: 410

London Bridge: Guignol's Band II (French: Le Pont de Londres) is a novel by the French writer Louis-Ferdinand Céline, published posthumously in 1964. The story follows Ferdinand, an invalid French World War I veteran who lives in exile in London, where he is involved with questionable people and falls in love with a 14-year-old girl. It is the sequel to Céline's 1944 novel Guignol's Band.

== Reception ==
The book was reviewed in Publishers Weekly in 1995: "Whatever one thinks of Celine's politics, it's hard to deny his position as an innovative, influential and still readable writer." The critic described some of the novel's plot elements, and wrote: "All this may sound distasteful, but this is the hard-edged world so perfectly suited to Celine's slangy, propulsive language, filled with ellipses and exclamation marks[.] Celine at his most grizzly is also Celine at his most maniacally funny[.]" The review ended: "Ferdinand is a semi-autobiographical character—like him, Celine was injured in the war and subsequently went to London—and, perhaps because of this personal connection, there is always a hint of vulnerability under the carapace of Celine's perpetual cynicism."

== See also ==
- 1964 in literature
- 20th-century French literature
