= Damian Catani =

Literary scholar (1973-)

Damian Catani (born in 1973) is a literary scholar who specialises in 19th- and 20th-century French literature. He has written books about Stéphane Mallarmé and Louis-Ferdinand Céline.

== Life and career ==
Catani was born in 1973 and obtained a doctorate from the University of Oxford in 2000. He is a senior lecturer in French at Birkbeck, University of London, where he began to teach in 2007. In 2003, Peter Lang published his book The Poet in Society: Art, Consumerism and Politics in Mallarmé, on the writings of Stéphane Mallarmé. Catani's Evil: A History in Modern French Literature and Thought, an interdisciplinary study of different approaches to evil in literature, philosophy and political theories, was published by Bloomsbury in 2013. His biography about the novelist Louis-Ferdinand Céline, Louis-Ferdinand Céline: Journeys to the Extreme, was published by Reaktion Books in 2021.
