= ActuaBD =

French comics website

- Website type: Comics website
- Available in: French
- Headquarters: Paris, France
- Editors: Kelian Nguyen; Guillaume Boutet (adjoint); Romain Garnier (adjoint)
- Managing director: Didier Pasamonik and Charles-Louis Detournay
- Website: actuabd.com
- Commercial: Yes
- Launched: 1996 (as Univers BD); 2000 (as ActuaBD)
- Current status: live

ActuaBD is a French-language online magazine dedicated to comics founded by Patrick Pinchart in 1996 with the former name Univers BD. It offers daily news, columns, criticism and interviews, as well as sometimes some more controversial cases in comic format (French: bande dessinée; BD). It is run by around fifty journalists and specialised columnists, all volunteers, and led by the editor-in-chief Kelian Nguyen with Charles-Louis Detournay, and Didier Pasamonik.

== History ==
The website Univers BD was founded in 1996 by the journalist Patrick Albray, who ran it alone for several years. In 2000, Univers BD became ActuaBD. Beginning in 2003, the former editor Didier Pasamonik joined thesite et and progressively became ots main contributor. Also in 2003 Nicolas Anspach joined the site and soon became its editor-in-chief. The following year, François Peneaud became the website's journalist in charge of covering US comics, a position he held for three years. In 2006, Charles-Louis Detournay joined the magazine. At the end of 2011, Charles-Louis Detournay replaced Anspach as editor. Aurélien Pigeat and Frédéric Hojlo became respectively chief writers for comics and alternative bandes dessinées, replaced in 2023 for Guillaume Boutet and Romain Garnier. In January 2026, Kelian Nguyen succeeded Charles-Louis Detournay as editor-in-chief, while the latter joins Didier Pasamonik in the management.

The ACBD's (French Association of Comics' Critics and Journalists) Gilles Ratier Report places ActuaBD in the first place among the French-language general information websites about comics. According to Patrick Gaumer, author of the Dictionnaire Larousse de la BD: "ActuaBD stands out for its independent spirit and the eclecticism of its content. Add to that its constant responsiveness […] as its name says!"

== Comics Personality of the Year ==
Since 2010, ActuaBD acknowledges a Personality of the Year, which can be for example a human, a character, a company, a publication.

- 2010: Jean Van Hamme, Belgian author
- 2011: Fanny Rodwell, Belgian editor
- 2012: Albert Uderzo, French author
- 2013: Spirou, comics character
- 2014: Gotlib, French author
- 2015: Charlie Hebdo, French magazine
- 2016: Catherine Meurisse, French author
- 2017: Gilles Ratier, French comic book historian
- 2018: Wilfrid Lupano, French comic book writer
- 2019: Emil Ferris, US comics author
- 2020: Hubert, French comics writer and colorist
- 2021: Luffy from One Piece, manga character
- 2022: Marguerite Abouet, Ivorian comics writer
- 2023: François Bourgeon, French writer and artist
- 2024: Emmanuel Guibert, French writer and artist
- 2025: Lucie Servin, French journalist

== Documentation ==
- Gaumer, Patrick (2010). "Actuabd.com". Dictionnaire mondial de la BD. Paris: Larousse. p. 4–5. ISBN 9782035843319.
