= John H. P. Marks =

British journalist and translator

John Hugo (Edgar) Puempin Marks (1908–1967) was a British journalist and translator from French and Spanish, the first to translate works by Céline into English.

Marks was educated at the Irish College in Gibraltar, the French lycée in Madrid, Aldenham School and Magdalene College, Cambridge. Marks, an aficionado of bull-fighting, was a journalist for The Times and the BBC. In the 1930s, he edited Night and Day with Graham Greene, until a libel action ended the journal in 1937. At one point he worked as night editor for United Press International in Lisbon.
