= I. O. Evans =

Idrisyn Oliver Evans (1894–1977) was an editor and writer from the Orange Free State. He lived in the UK from an early age, and was a UK civil servant from 1912. He retired in 1956, but continued working as an editor.

Evans was noted as a translator of the works of Jules Verne. He also wrote about inventions, and penned historical novels featuring inventions. In 1966, Evans edited a work called Science Fiction through the Ages.

== Works ==
=== Fiction ===
- Gadget City: A Story of Ancient Alexandria (1944)
- The Heavens Declare: A Story of Galileo Scientist-Astronomer (1949)
- Strange Devices: A Story of the Siege of Syracuse (1950)
- The Coming of a King; A Story of the Stone Age (1950)

=== Non-fiction ===
- The World of Tomorrow – A Junior Book of Forecasts (1933)
- Inventors of the World (1962)
- Jules Verne and his Work (1965)
- Observer's Book of Geology

=== Works as editor ===
- Anthology of Armageddon (1935)
- Jules Verne – Master of Science Fiction (1956)
- Science Fiction through the Ages (1966) – two volumes
