= Louis-Ferdinand Céline =

French writer (1894–1961)

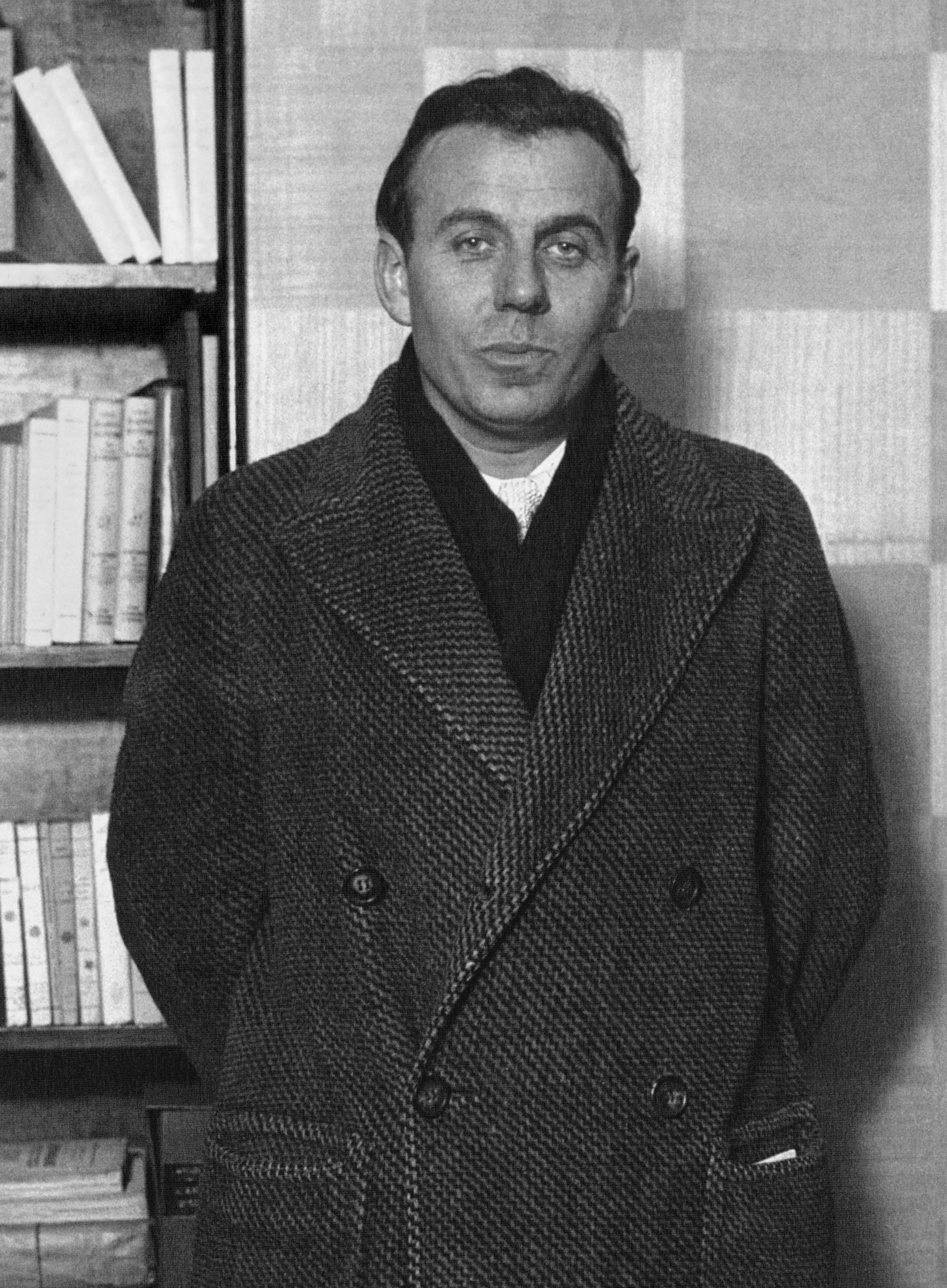
- Céline in 1932
- Born: Louis Ferdinand Auguste Destouches; 27 May 1894; Courbevoie, France
- Died: 1 July 1961 (aged 67); Meudon, France
- Occupations: Novelist, pamphleteer, physician
- Spouses: Suzanne Nebout (m. 1915; sep. 1916); Édith Follet (m. 1919; div. 1926); Lucette Destouches (m. 1943)
- Partner: Elizabeth Craig (1926–1933)
- Writing career
- Notable works: Journey to the End of the Night (1932); Death on Credit (1936); Castle to Castle (1957); North (1960)

Louis Ferdinand Auguste Destouches (27 May 1894 – 1 July 1961), better known by the pen name Louis-Ferdinand Céline (/seɪˈliːn/ say-LEEN; French: [lwi fɛʁdinɑ̃ selin]), was a French novelist, polemicist, and physician. His first novel Journey to the End of the Night (1932) won the Prix Renaudot but divided critics due to the author's pessimistic depiction of the human condition and his writing style based on working-class speech. In subsequent novels such as Death on the Installment Plan (1936), Guignol's Band (1944) and Castle to Castle (1957), Céline further developed an innovative and distinctive literary style. Maurice Nadeau wrote: "What Joyce did for the English language...what the surrealists attempted to do for the French language, Céline achieved effortlessly and on a vast scale."

From 1937 Céline wrote a series of antisemitic polemical works in which he advocated a military alliance with Nazi Germany. He continued to publicly espouse antisemitic views during the German occupation of France, and after the Allied landing in Normandy in 1944, he fled to Germany and then Denmark where he lived in exile. He was convicted of collaboration by a French court in 1951 but was pardoned by a military tribunal soon after. He returned to France where he resumed his careers as a doctor and author.

Céline is widely considered to be one of the greatest French novelists of the 20th century, and his novels have had an enduring influence on later authors. However, he remains a controversial figure in France due to his antisemitism and activities during the Second World War.

== Biography ==
=== Early life ===
The only child of Fernand Destouches and Marguerite-Louise-Céline Guilloux, he was born Louis Ferdinand Auguste Destouches in 1894 at Courbevoie, just outside Paris in the Seine département (now Hauts-de-Seine). The family came originally from Normandy on his father's side and Brittany on his mother's side. His father was a middle manager in an insurance company, and his mother owned a boutique where she sold antique lace. In 1905, he was awarded his Certificat d'études, after which he worked as an apprentice and messenger boy in various trades.

Between 1908 and 1910, his parents sent him to Germany and England for a year in each country in order to acquire foreign languages for future employment. From the time he left school until the age of eighteen Céline worked in various jobs, leaving or losing them after only short periods of time. He worked for silk sellers and jewellers first at eleven, as an errand boy, and later as a salesperson for a local goldsmith. Although he was no longer being formally educated, he bought schoolbooks with the money he earned and studied by himself. It was around this time that Céline vaguely thought of becoming a doctor.

=== World War I and Africa ===
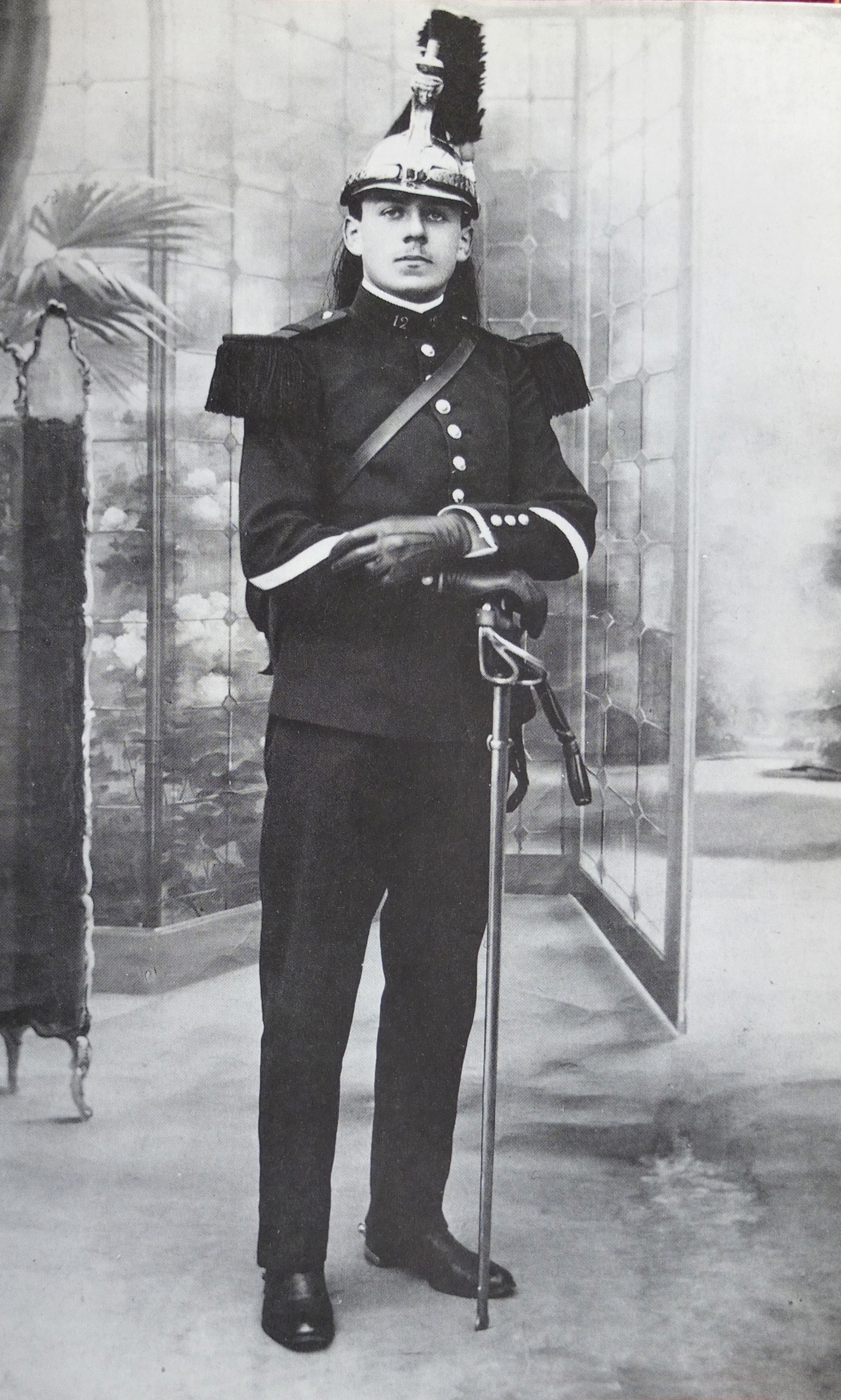
Céline in military uniform, 1914

In 1912, Céline volunteered for the French army (in what he described as an act of rebellion against his parents) and began a three-year enlistment in the 12th Cuirassier Regiment stationed in Rambouillet. At first he was unhappy with military life and considered deserting. However, he adapted and eventually attained the rank of sergeant. The beginning of the First World War brought action to Céline's unit. On 25 October 1914, he volunteered to deliver a message when others were reluctant to do so because of heavy German fire. Near Ypres, during his attempt to deliver the message, he was wounded in his right arm. (Although he was not wounded in the head, as he later claimed, he did suffer severe headaches and tinnitus for the rest of his life.) For his bravery, he was awarded the médaille militaire in November and appeared one year later in the weekly l'Illustré National (November 1915). He later wrote that his wartime experience left him with "a profound disgust for all that is bellicose."

In March 1915, he was sent to London to work in the French passport office. He spent his nights visiting music halls and the haunts of the London underworld and claimed to have met Mata Hari. He later drew on his experiences in the city for his novel Guignol's Band (1944). In September, he was declared unfit for military duty and was discharged from the army. Before returning to France, he married Suzanne Nebout, a French dancer, but the marriage was not registered with the French Consulate, and they soon separated.

In 1916, Céline went to French-administered Cameroon as an employee of the Forestry Company of Sangha-Oubangui. He worked as an overseer on a plantation and a trading post and ran a pharmacy for the local inhabitants, procuring essential medical supplies from his parents in France. He left Africa in April 1917 due to ill health. His experiences in Africa left him with a distaste for colonialism and an increasing passion for medicine as a vocation.

=== Becoming a doctor (1918–1924) ===
In March 1918, Céline was employed by the Rockefeller Foundation as part of a team travelling around Brittany delivering information sessions on tuberculosis and hygiene. He met Dr Athanase Follet of the Medical Faculty of the University of Rennes and soon became close to Follet's daughter Édith. Dr Follet encouraged him to pursue medicine, and Céline studied for his baccalaureate part-time, passing his examinations in July 1919. He married Édith in August.

Céline enrolled in the Medical Faculty at Rennes in April 1920, and in June, Édith gave birth to a daughter, Collette Destouches. In 1923 he transferred to the University of Paris, and in May 1924 defended his dissertation The Life and Work of Philippe-Ignace Semmelweis (1818–1865), which has been called, "a Célinian novel in miniature".

=== League of Nations and medical practice (1924–1931) ===
In June 1924 Céline joined the Health Department of the League of Nations in Geneva, leaving his wife and daughter in Rennes. His duties involved extensive travel in Europe and Africa, Canada, the United States and Cuba. He drew on his time with the League for his play The Church (L'Église), written in 1926, but first published in 1933).

Édith divorced him in June 1926, and a few months later he met Elizabeth Craig, an American dancer studying in Geneva. They were to remain together for the six years in which he established himself as a major author. He later wrote: "I wouldn't have amounted to anything without her."

He left the League of Nations in late 1927 and set up a medical practice in the working-class Paris suburb of Clichy. The practice was not profitable and he supplemented his income working for the nearby public clinic and a pharmaceutical company. In 1929 he gave up his private practice and moved to Montmartre with Elizabeth. However, he continued to practise at the public clinic in Clichy as well as other clinics and working for pharmaceutical companies. In his spare time he worked on his first novel, Voyage au bout de la nuit (Journey to the End of the Night), which was dedicated to Elizabeth, completing it in late 1931.

=== Writer, physician and polemicist (1932–1939) ===
Voyage au bout de la nuit was published in October 1932 to widespread critical attention. Although Destouches sought anonymity under the pen name Céline, his identity was soon revealed by the press. The novel attracted admirers and detractors across the political spectrum, with some praising its anarchist, anticolonialist and antimilitarist themes, while one critic condemned it as "the cynical, jeering confessions of a man without courage or nobility." A critic for Les Nouvelles littéraires praised the author's use of spoken colloquial French as an "extraordinary language, the height of the natural and the artificial" while the critic for Le Populaire de Paris condemned it as mere vulgarity and obscenity. The novel was the favourite for the Prix Goncourt of 1932. When the prize was awarded to Mazeline's Les Loups, the resulting scandal increased publicity for Céline's novel, which sold 50,000 copies in the following two months.

Despite the success of Voyage, Céline saw his vocation as medicine and continued his work at the Clichy clinic and private pharmaceutical laboratories. He also began working on a novel about his childhood and youth which was to become Mort à credit (1936, Death on the Installment Plan). In June 1933 Elizabeth Craig returned permanently to America. Céline visited her in Los Angeles the following year but failed to persuade her to return.

Céline initially refused to take a public stance on the rise of Nazism and the increasing extreme-right political agitation in France, explaining to a friend in 1933: "I am and have always been an anarchist, I have never voted...I will never vote for anything or anybody...I don't believe in men...The Nazis loathe me as much as the socialists and the commies too." Nevertheless, in 1935, British critic William Empson had written that Céline appeared to be "a man ripe for fascism".

Mort à credit was published in May 1936, with numerous blank spaces where passages had been removed by the publisher for fear of prosecution for obscenity. The critical response was sharply divided, with the majority of reviewers criticising it for gutter language, pessimism and contempt for humanity. The novel sold 35,000 copies by late 1938.

In August Céline visited Leningrad for a month and on his return quickly wrote and had published an essay, Mea Culpa, in which he denounced communism and the Soviet Union.

In December the following year Bagatelles pour un massacre (Trifles for a Massacre) was published, a book-length racist and antisemitic polemic in which Céline advocated a military alliance with Hitler's Germany in order to save France from war and Jewish hegemony. The book won qualified support from some sections of the French far-right and sold 75,000 copies up to the end of the war. Céline followed Bagatelles with Ecole des cadavres (School for Corpses) (November 1938) in which he developed the themes of antisemitism and a Franco-German alliance.

Céline was now living with Lucette Almansor, a French dancer whom he had met in 1935. They were to marry in 1943 and remain together until Céline's death. On the publication of Bagatelles, Céline quit his jobs at the Clichy clinic and the pharmaceutical laboratory and devoted himself to his writing.

=== 1939 to 1945 ===
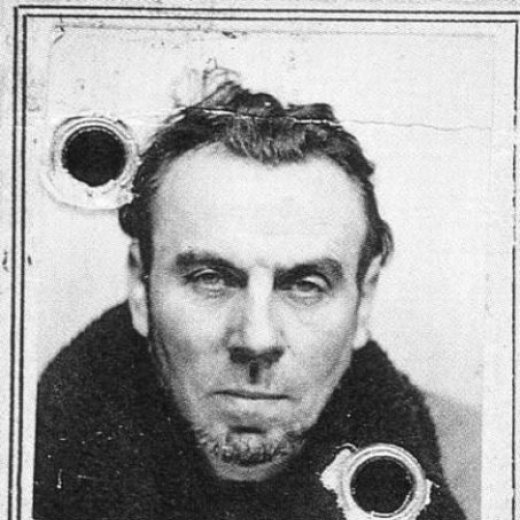
Céline c. 1944

At the outbreak of war in September 1939, the draft board declared Céline 70% disabled and unfit for military service. Céline gained employment as a ship's doctor on a troop transport, and in January 1940, the ship accidentally rammed a British torpedo boat, killing twenty British crewmen. In February he found a position as a doctor in a public clinic in Sartrouville northwest of Paris. On the evacuation of Paris in June, Céline and Lucette commandeered an ambulance and evacuated an elderly woman and two newborn infants to La Rochelle. "I did the retreat myself, like many another, I chased the French army all the way from Bezons to La Rochelle, but I could never catch up."

Returning to Paris, Céline was appointed head doctor of the Bezons public clinic and accredited physician to the département of Seine-et-Oise. He moved back to Montmartre and in February 1941 published a third polemical book Les beaux draps (A Fine Mess) in which he denounced Jews, Freemasons, the Catholic Church, the educational system and the French army. The book was later banned by the Vichy government for defaming the French military.

In October 1942, Céline's antisemitic books Bagatelles pour un massacre and L'École des cadavres were republished in new editions, only months after the round-up of French Jews at the Vélodrome d'Hiver. Céline devoted most of his time during the occupation years to his medical work and writing a new novel, Guignol's Band, a hallucinatory reworking of his experiences in London during World War I. The novel was published in March 1944 to poor sales.

The French were expecting an Allied landing at any time, and Céline was receiving anonymous death threats almost daily. Although he had not officially joined any collaborationist organisations, he had frequently allowed himself to be quoted in the collaborationist press expressing antisemitic views. The BBC had also named him as a collaborationist writer.

When the Allies landed in France in June 1944, Céline and Lucette fled to Germany, eventually staying in Sigmaringen where the Germans had created an enclave accommodating the Vichy government in exile and collaborationist militia. Using his connections with the German occupying forces, in particular with SS officer Hermann Bickler who was often his guest in the apartment on Rue Girardon, Céline obtained visas for German-occupied Denmark where he arrived in late March 1945. These events formed the basis for his postwar German trilogy of novels Castle to Castle (1957, D'un château l'autre), North (1960, Nord) and Rigadoon (1969, Rigodon).

=== Exile in Denmark (1945–1951) ===
In November 1945 the new French government applied for Céline's extradition for collaboration, and the following month he was arrested and imprisoned at Vestre Prison by the Danish authorities pending the outcome of the application. He was released from prison in June 1947 on the condition that he would not leave Denmark. Céline's books had been withdrawn from sale in France, and he was living off a hoard of gold coins which he had hidden in Denmark before the war. In 1948 he moved to a farmhouse on the coast of the Great Belt owned by his Danish lawyer where he worked on the novels which were to become Féerie pour une autre fois (1952, Fable for Another Time) and Normance (1954).

The French authorities tried Céline in absentia for activities harmful to the national defence. He was found guilty in February 1951 and sentenced to one year in jail, a fine of 50,000 francs, and confiscation of half his property. In April a French military tribunal granted him an amnesty based on his status as a disabled war veteran. In July he returned to France.

=== Final years in France (1951–1961) ===
Back in France, Céline signed a contract with the publisher Gallimard to republish all his novels. Céline and Lucette bought a villa in Meudon on the southwestern outskirts of Paris where Céline was to live for the remainder of his life. He registered as a doctor in 1953 and set up a practice in his Meudon home, while Lucette established a dance school on the top floor.

Céline's first postwar novels, Féerie pour une autre fois and Normance, received little critical attention and sold poorly. However, his 1957 novel D'un château l'autre, a chronicle of his time in Sigmaringen, attracted considerable media and critical interest and revived the controversy over his wartime activities. The novel was a modest commercial success, selling close to 30,000 copies in its first year. A sequel, Nord, was published in 1960 to generally favourable reviews. Céline completed a second draft of his final novel, Rigodon, on 30 June 1961. He died at home of a ruptured aneurysm the following day.

== Antisemitism, fascism and collaboration ==
While Céline's first two novels contained no overt antisemitism, his polemical books Bagatelles pour un massacre (Trifles for a Massacre) (1937) and L'École des cadavres (The School of Corpses) (1938) were virulently antisemitic. Céline's antisemitism was generally welcomed by the French far-right, but some such as Brasillach were concerned that its crudity might be counterproductive. Nevertheless, biographer Frédéric Vitoux concludes that: "through the ferocity of his voice and the respect in which it was held, Céline had made himself the most popular and most resounding spokesman of prewar antisemitism."

Céline's public antisemitism continued after the defeat of France in June 1940. In 1941 he published Les beaux draps (A Fine Mess) in which he lamented that: "France is Jewish and Masonic, once and for all." He also contributed over thirty letters, interviews and responses to questionnaires to the collaborationist press, including many antisemitic statements. The German officer and writer Ernst Jünger stated in his Paris war diaries that Céline told him on 7 December 1941 "of his consternation, his astonishment" that the Germans did not "exterminate" the French Jews. Some Nazis thought Céline's antisemitic pronouncements were so extreme as to be counter-productive. Bernhard Payr, the German superintendent of propaganda in France, considered that Céline "started from correct racial notions" but his "savage, filthy slang" and "brutal obscenities" spoiled his "good intentions" with "hysterical wailing".

Céline's attitude towards fascism was ambiguous. In 1937 and 1938 he advocated a Franco-German military alliance to save France from war and Jewish hegemony. However, Vitoux argues that Céline's main motive was a desire for peace at any cost rather than enthusiasm for Hitler. Following the election victory of the French Popular Front in May 1936, Céline saw the socialist leader Léon Blum and the communists led by Maurice Thorez as greater threats to France than Hitler: "...I'd prefer a dozen Hitlers to one all-powerful Blum."

While Céline claimed he was not a fascist and never joined any fascist organisation, in December 1941 he publicly supported the formation of a single party to unite the French far-right. When Germany invaded the Soviet Union in June 1941, he expressed his support for Jacques Doriot's Legion of French Volunteers Against Bolshevism (LVF). However, according to Merlin Thomas, Céline didn't "subscribe to any recognisable fascist ideology other than the attack on Jewry." Paul Baxa argues that although Céline did not present a specific fascist ideology, "his attitude and worldview made him a natural fascist".

Following the war, Céline was found guilty of activities potentially harmful to national defence due to his membership of the collaborationist Cercle Européen (which Céline denied) and his letters to collaborationist journals. According to Vitoux: "Céline became a member of no committee and no administration (...). He never provided any assistance, either by report, advice, or information, to the German ambassador, let alone the Gestapo or the Central Jewish Office." Nevertheless: "Céline's writings had permanently marked French ideology, furthered and supported its antisemitism and consequently its complacency toward the Germans. That cannot be denied."

== Literary themes and style ==
=== Themes ===
Céline's novels reflect a pessimistic view of the human condition in which human suffering is inevitable, death is final, and hopes for human progress and happiness are illusory. He depicts a world where there is no moral order and where the rich and powerful will always oppress the poor and weak. According to Céline's biographer Patrick McCarthy, Célinian man suffers from an original sin of malicious hatred, but there is no God to redeem him. "The characteristic trait of Célinian hatred is that it is gratuitous: one does not dislike because the object of dislike has harmed one; one hates because one has to."

Literary critic Merlin Thomas notes that the experience of war marked Céline for life, and it is a theme in all his novels except Death on the Installment Plan. In Journey to the End of the Night, Céline presents the horror and stupidity of war as an implacable force which "turns the ordinary individual into an animal intent only on survival". McCarthy contends that for Céline war is "the most striking manifestation of the evil present in the human condition."

The individual's struggle for survival in a hostile world is a recurring theme in Céline's novels. Although Célinian man can't escape his fate, according to McCarthy: "he has some control over his death. He need not be arbitrarily slaughtered in battle and he need not blind himself with divertissements. He can choose to face death, a more painful but more dignified process."

Merlin Thomas points out that the Célinian anti-hero also typically chooses defiance. "If you are weak, then you will derive strength from stripping those you fear of all the prestige they pretend to possess (...) [T]he attitude of defiance just outlined is an element of hope and personal salvation."

Thomas notes that the Célinian narrator finds some consolation in beauty and creativity. The narrator is "always touched by human physical beauty, by the contemplation of a splendidly formed human body which moves with grace." For Céline ballet and the ballerina are exemplars of artistic and human beauty. McCarthy points out that Céline habitually depicts the movement of people and objects as a dance and attempts to capture the rhythms of dance and music in language. "Yet the dance is always the danse macabre and things disintegrate because death strikes them."

=== Style ===
Céline was critical of the French "academic" literary style which privileged elegance, clarity and exactitude. He advocated a new style aimed at directly conveying emotional intensity:

It seemed to me that there were two ways of telling stories. The classic, normal, academic way which consists of creeping along from one incident to the next...the way cars go along in the street...and then, the other way, which means descending into the intimacy of things, into the fibre, the nerves, the feelings of things, the flesh, and going straight on to the end, to its end, in intimacy, in maintained poetic tension, in inner life, like the métro through an inner city, straight to the end...[.]

Céline was a major innovator in French literary language. In his first two novels, Journey to the End of the Night and Death on the Installment Plan, Céline shocked many critics by his use of a unique language based on the spoken French of the working class, medical and nautical jargon, neologisms, obscenities, and the specialised slang of soldiers, sailors and the criminal underworld. He also developed an idiosyncratic system of punctuation based on extensive use of ellipses and exclamation marks. Thomas sees Céline's three dots as: "almost comparable to the pointing of a psalm: they divide the text into rhythmical rather than syntactical units, permit extreme variations of pace and make possible to a great extent the hallucinatory lyricism of his style."

Céline called his increasingly rhythmic, syncopated writing style his "little music." McCarthy writes that in Fables for Another Time: "Celine's fury drives him beyond prose and into a new tongue – part poetry and part music – to express what he has to say." Céline's style evolved to reflect the themes of his novels. According to McCarthy, in Céline's final war trilogy, Castle to Castle, North and Rigadoon: "all worlds disappear into an eternal nothingness (...) the trilogy is written in short, bare phrases: language dissolves as reality does."

== Legacy ==
Céline is widely considered to be one of the major French novelists of the twentieth century. According to George Steiner: "[T]wo bodies of work lead into the idiom and sensibility of twentieth-century narrative: that of Céline and that of Proust."

Although many writers have admired and been influenced by Céline's fiction, McCarthy argues that he holds a unique place in modern writing due to his pessimistic vision of the human condition and idiosyncratic writing style. Writers of the absurd, such as Sartre and Camus, were influenced by Céline but didn't share his extreme pessimism or politics. Alain Robbe-Grillet cites Céline as a major influence on the nouveau-roman and Günter Grass also shows a debt to Céline's writing style. Patrick Modiano admires Céline as a stylist and produced a parody of his style in his debut novel La place de l'étoile. McCarthy and O'Connell include Henry Miller, William S. Burroughs, Kurt Vonnegut and others as American writers influenced by Céline.

Céline remains a controversial figure in France. In 2011, the fiftieth anniversary of Céline's death, the writer had initially appeared on an official list of 500 people and events associated with French culture which were to be celebrated nationally that year. Following protests, Frédéric Mitterrand, then French Minister of Culture and Communication, announced that Céline would be removed from the list because of his antisemitic writings.

In December 2017, the French government and Jewish leaders expressed concern over plans by the publisher Gallimard to republish Céline's antisemitic books. In January 2018 Gallimard announced that it was suspending publication. In March Gallimard clarified that it still intended to publish a critical edition of the books with scholarly introductions.

In August 2021, it was revealed that a collection of Céline's unpublished manuscripts including La Volonté du roi Krogold and Londres, and 6,000 unpublished pages of already published works (Casse-pipe, Mort à crédit, Journey to the End of the Night) had been handed over by a Libération journalist, Jean-Pierre Thibaudat, to the Nanterre police in March 2020. The manuscripts had been missing since Céline fled Paris in 1944. French writer and Céline expert David Alliot maintains that it will take many years for these writings to be completely appreciated and published. Writing in The Jewish Chronicle in September 2021, Oliver Kamm described Céline as a "French literary hero [who] needs to be forgotten". The lost manuscripts of Céline have been described as "one of the greatest literary discoveries of the past century but also one of the most troubling".

In May 2022, Céline's Guerre (War) was published by Gallimard and Londres (London) followed in October 2022. The latter novel was probably written in 1934 and includes a key character who is a Jewish doctor.

== Works ==
=== Novels and short story ===
- Des vagues (Waves), short story, written in 1917, published in the fourth volume of Cahiers Céline de Gallimard in 1977 (untranslated)
- Journey to the End of the Night (Voyage au bout de la nuit) 1932; tr. by John H. P. Marks (1934); tr. by Manheim, Ralph (1983). New York: New Directions Publishing ISBN 0-8112-0847-8
- Londres (London), written in 1934, published in Paris by Gallimard in 2022, tr. by Mandell, Charlotte (October 2026), New York: New Directions Publishing ISBN 978-0-8112-3734-5
- War (Guerre) 1934; tr. by Mandell, Charlotte (July 2024), New York: New Directions Publishing ISBN 9780811237321; tr. by Berg, Sander (October 2024), London: Alma Classics ISBN 9781847499165.
- Death on Credit (Mort à crédit), 1936; tr. by Marks, John H. P., Little, Brown and Company, Boston, 1938 – aka Death on the Installment Plan (US, 1966), tr. by Ralph Manheim
- Guignol's Band, 1944; tr. by Bernard Frechtman and Jack T. Nile, (1954). London: Vision Press
- Cannon-Fodder (Casse-pipe) 1949; tr. by Kyra De Coninck and Billy Childish (1988). Hangman
- Fable for Another Time (Féerie pour une autre fois) 1952; tr. by Hudson, Mary (2003). Lincoln and London: University of Nebraska Press ISBN 0-8032-6424-0
- Normance, 1954; tr. by Jones, Marlon (2009). Dalkey Archive Press ISBN 978-1-56478-525-1 (Sequel to Fable for Another Time.)
- Castle to Castle (D'un château l'autre) 1957; tr. by Manheim, Ralph (1968). New York: Delacorte Press
- North (Nord), 1960; tr. by Manheim, Ralph (1972). New York: Delacorte Press
- London Bridge: Guignol's Band II (Le Pont de Londres − Guignol's band II), published posthumously in 1964; tr. by Di Bernardi, Dominic (1995). Dalkey Archive Press ISBN 1-56478-071-6
- Rigadoon (Rigodon), completed in 1961 but published posthumously in 1969; tr. by Manheim, Ralph (1974). New York: Delacorte Press

=== Other selected works ===
- Semmelweis (La Vie et l'œuvre de Philippe Ignace Semmelweis. [1924]), Harman, John (tr.) (2008). London: Atlas Press. ISBN 978-1-900565-47-9
- The Church (L'Église), (written 1927, published 1933; tr. by Mark Spitzer and Simon Green, Green Integer, 2003
- Mea Culpa, 1936; tr. by Robert Allerton Parker, Little, Brown and Company, Boston, 1937
- Trifles for a Massacre (Bagatelles pour un massacre), 1937; translated anonymously
- School for Corpses (L'École des cadavres), 1938; tr. by Szandor Kuragin, 2016, Louis Ferdinand Céline – School For Corpses
- A Fine Mess (Les Beaux Draps), 1941 (untranslated)
- "Reply to Charges of Treason Made by the French Department of Justice (Réponses aux accusations formulées contre moi par la justice française au titre de trahison et reproduites par la Police Judiciaire danoise au cours de mes interrogatoires, pendant mon incarcération 1945–1946 à Copenhague, 6 November 1946"; tr. by Julien Cornell, South Atlantic Quarterly 93, no. 2, 1994
- Conversations with Professor Y (Entretiens avec le Professeur Y), 1955; tr. by Stanford Luce (2006). Dalkey Archive Press. ISBN 1-56478-449-5
- Ballets without Music, without Dancers, without Anything, (Ballets sans musique, sans personne, sans rien, (1959); tr. by Thomas Christensen and Carol Christensen, Green Integer, 1999
- Carnet du cuirassier Destouches, dans Casse-Pipe, Paris, Gallimard, 1970 (untranslated)
- Progrés, Paris, Mercure de France, 1978 (untranslated)
- Arletty, jeune fille dauphinoise (scénario), Pris, La Flute de Pan, 1983 (untranslated)
- The Selected Correspondence of Louis-Ferdinand Céline; tr. Mitch Abidor, Kilmog Press, New Zealand, 2015

== Works cited ==
- Empson, William (1966). Some Versions of Pastoral. Harmondsworth, Middlesex: Penguin Books.
- Gibault, François (1985). Céline: 3e partie. Cavalier de l'Apocalypse (1944–1961). Paris: Mercure de France. ISBN 2-7152-1247-X.
- McCarthy, Patrick (1976). Céline. New York: The Viking Press.
- O'Connell, David (1976). Louis-Ferdinand Céline. Boston: Twayne Publishers. ISBN 978-0-8057-6256-3.
- Sautermeister, Christine (2013). Louis Ferdinand Céline à Sigmaringen Novembre 1944 – Mars 1945: Chronique d´un séjour controversé. Paris: Édition Écriture. ISBN 978-2-35905-095-0.
- Thomas, Merlin (1980). Louis-Ferdinand Céline. New York: New Direction. ISBN 0-8112-0754-4.
- Vitoux, Frédéric (1992). Céline: A Biography. New York. ISBN 1-55778-255-5.
