= Günter Grass bibliography =

German writer, sculptor and graphic artist

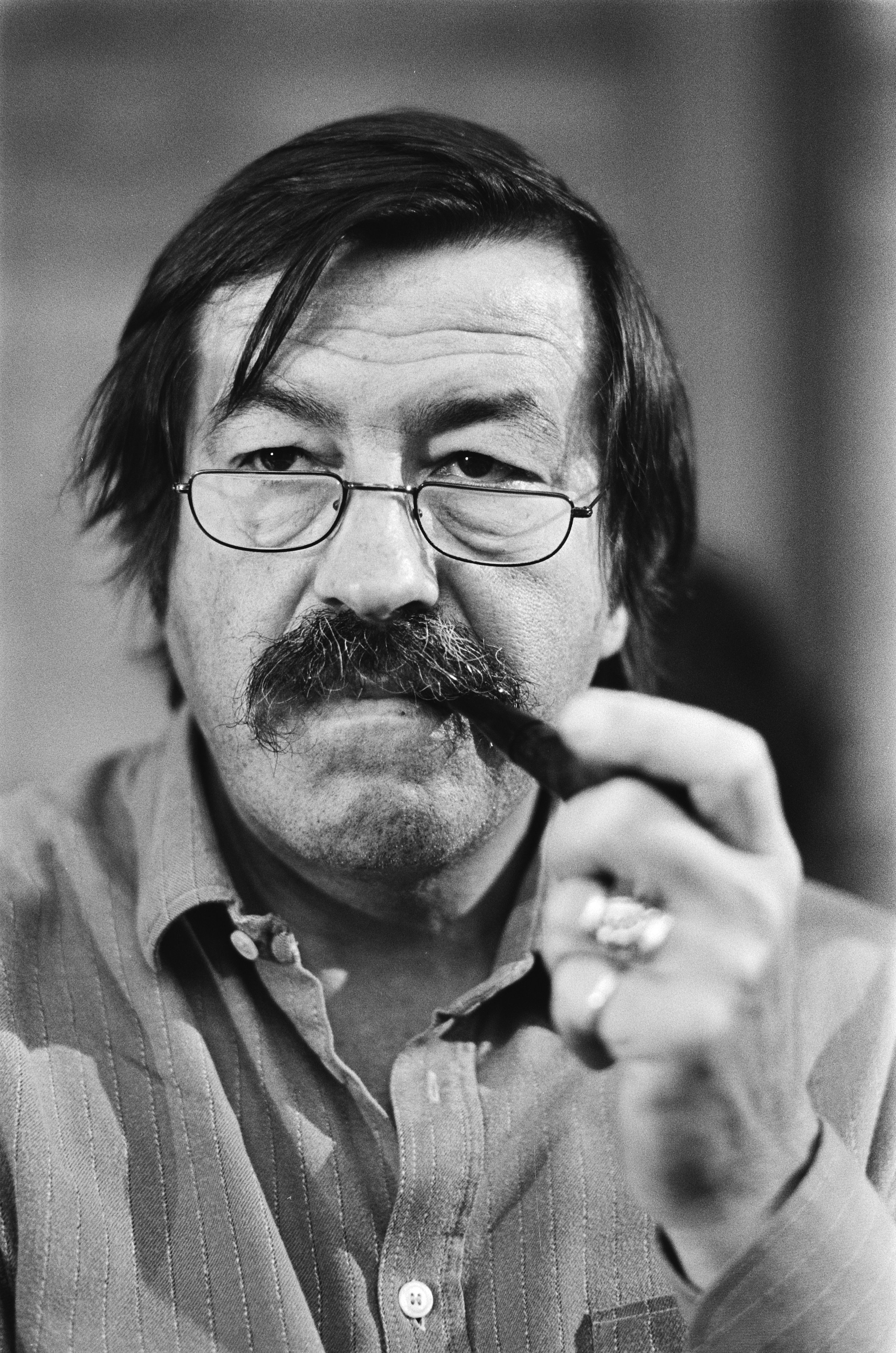
Grass in 1982

Günter Grass (16 October 1927 – 13 April 2015) was a German writer, sculptor and graphic artist. He had an international breakthrough as a novelist with his Danzig Trilogy (1959–1963). He was awarded the Georg Büchner Prize in 1965 and the Nobel Prize in Literature in 1999.

== Bibliography ==
Grass wrote the following books.

=== Poetry ===
- Die Vorzüge der Windhühner (poems, 1956); Steidl, 2007, ISBN 978-3-86521-569-7
- Gleisdreieck (poems, 1960)
- Ausgefragt (poems, 1967)
- Letzte Tänze (poems, 2003)
- Dummer August (poems, 2007)

=== Plays ===
- Die bösen Köche. Ein Drama (play, 1956) ISSN 0722-8511 translated as The Wicked Cooks in Four Plays (1967)
- Hochwasser. Ein Stück in zwei Akten (play, 1957) The Flood
- Onkel, Onkel. Ein Spiel in vier Akten (play, 1958) Mister, Mister
- Die Plebejer proben den Aufstand (play, 1966) trans. The Plebeians Rehearse the Uprising (1966)
- Davor (play, 1970) trans. Max (1972) on a plot from Local Anaesthetic

=== Novel Series ===
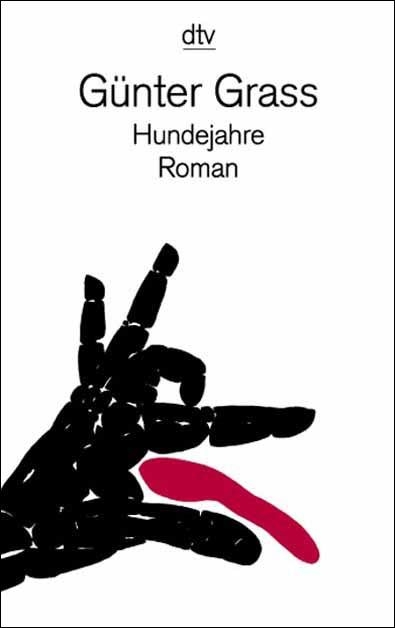
Dog Years, cover from 1999

Danzig

1. Die Blechtrommel (novel, 1959) trans. The Tin Drum (1959) ISBN 978-0-679-72575-6.
2. Katz und Maus (novella, 1961) trans. Cat and Mouse (1963) ISBN 978-0-15-615551-9
3. Hundejahre (novel, 1963) trans. Dog Years (1965) ISBN 978-0-7493-9450-9

=== Novels and short stories ===
- Örtlich betäubt (novel, 1969) trans. Local Anaesthetic (1970) ISBN 978-0-449-24257-5
- Der Butt (novel, 1977) trans. The Flounder (1978) ISBN 978-0-15-631935-5
- Das Treffen in Telgte (novel, 1979) trans. The Meeting at Telgte (1981)
- Kopfgeburten oder Die Deutschen sterben aus (novel, 1980) trans. Headbirths, or, the Germans are Dying Out (1982)
- Die Rättin (novel, 1986) trans. The Rat (1987) ISBN 978-0-15-675830-7
- Unkenrufe (novel, 1992) trans. The Call of the Toad (1992) ISBN 978-0-15-615340-9
- Ein weites Feld (novel, 1995) trans. Too Far Afield (2000) ISBN 978-0-15-601416-8
- Mein Jahrhundert (short story collection, 1999) trans. My Century (1999) ISBN 978-0-15-601141-9
1. Im Krebsgang (novel, 2002) trans. Crabwalk (2002) ISBN 978-0-15-602970-4
- Die Artur-Knoff-Geschichten. Steidl Verlag, Göttingen 2019, ISBN 978-3-95829-292-5 (untranslated)
- Figurenstehen (2022). trans. The Living Statue: A Legend (2024)

=== Non-Fiction ===
- Über das Selbstverständliche. Reden – Aufsätze – Offene Briefe – Kommentare (speeches, essays, 1968) trans. Speak out! Speeches, Open Letters, Commentaries (1969) with 3 additional pieces
- Aus dem Tagebuch einer Schnecke (political reportage, 1972) trans. From the Diary of a Snail (1973) ISBN 978-0-7493-9455-4
- Der Bürger und seine Stimme. Reden Aufsätze Kommentare (speeches, essays, 1974)
- Denkzettel. Politische Reden und Aufsätze 1965–1976 (political essays and speeches, 1978)
- Widerstand lernen. Politische Gegenreden 1980–1983 (political speeches, 1984)
- Zunge zeigen. Ein Tagebuch in Zeichnungen (political diary, 1988) trans. Show Your Tongue (1989)
- Beim Häuten der Zwiebel (memoir, 2006) trans. Peeling the Onion (2007) ISBN 978-0-15-603534-7 – first volume of memoir
- Die Box (memoir, 2008) trans. The Box (2010) ISBN 978-0-09-953975-9 – second volume of memoir
- Unterwegs von Deutschland nach Deutschland. Tagebuch 1990. (political diary, 2009) trans. From Germany to Germany: Diary 1990 (2012) ISBN 978-0-547-36460-5
- Grimms Wörter (memoir, 2010) Third volume of memoir.
- Vonne Endlichkait (collection of prose, poetry, and drawings, 2015) ISBN 978-3-95829-042-6

Collections in English translation

- Four Plays (1967) including Ten Minutes to Buffalo
- In the Egg and Other Poems (1977)
- Two States One Nation? (1990)
- Of All That Ends (poetry and prose) (6 December 2016) ISBN 978-0-544-78538-0
