= 1999 Nobel Prize in Literature =

- Günter Grass
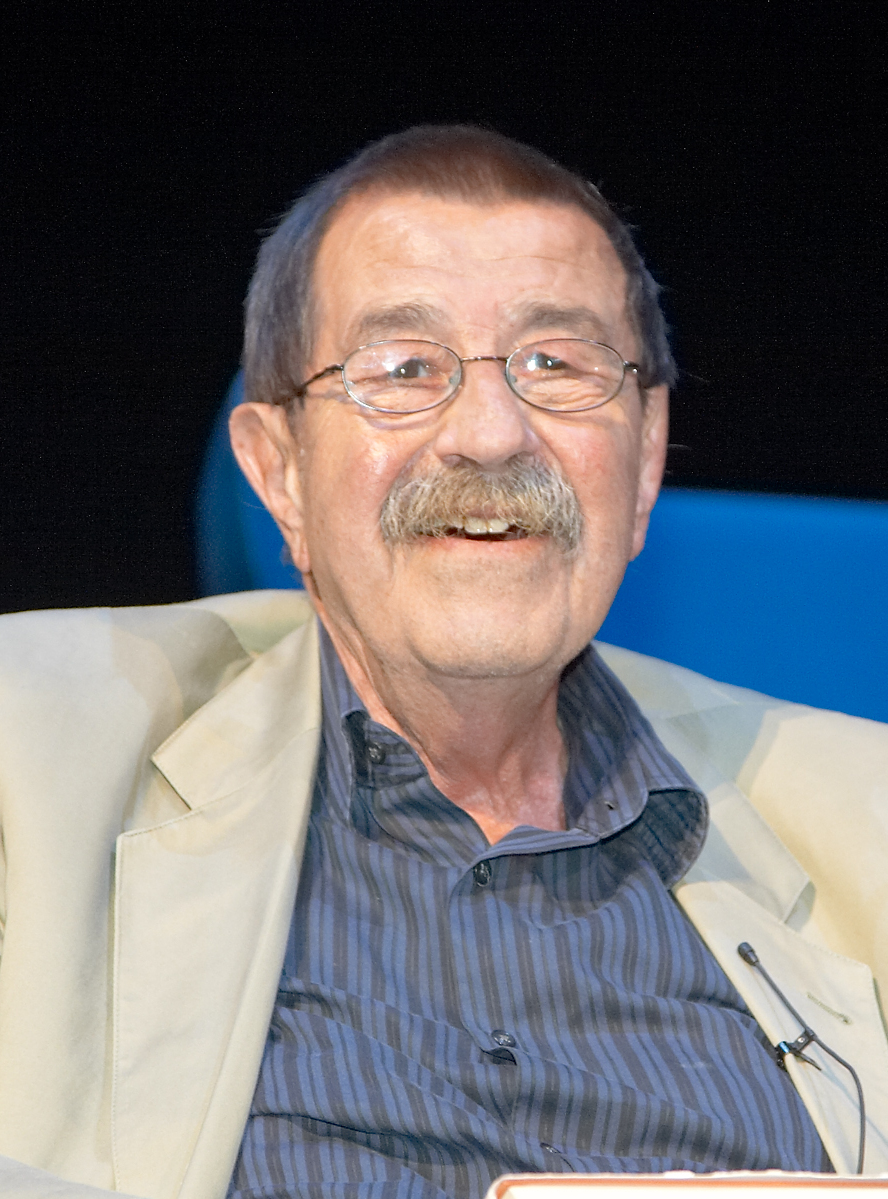
- "whose frolicsome black fables portray the forgotten face of history."
- Date: 30 September 1999 (announcement); 10 December 1999 (ceremony)
- Location: Stockholm, Sweden
- Presented by: Swedish Academy
- First award: 1901
- Website: Official website

The 1999 Nobel Prize in Literature was awarded to the German writer Günter Grass (1927–2015) "whose frolicsome black fables portray the forgotten face of history." He is the eighth German author to become a recipient of the prize after Heinrich Böll in 1972.

== Laureate ==
Nazi war crimes and World War II served as the setting for several books written by Günter Grass. His major achievement was the Danzig Trilogy which comprises Die Blechtrommel ("The Tin Drum", 1959), Katz und Maus ("Cat and Mouse", 1963), and Hundejahre ("Dog Years", 1963). Several of his novels are set in the city of Danzig and Gdańsk and its alternating German and Polish connection. His use of real and autobiographical details alongside fictitious occurrences to create a sarcastic societal satire is a defining aspect of his writing style. His other well-known works include Der Butt ("The Flounder", 1977), Die Rättin ("The Rat", 1986), and Unkenrufe (The Call of the Toad", 1992).

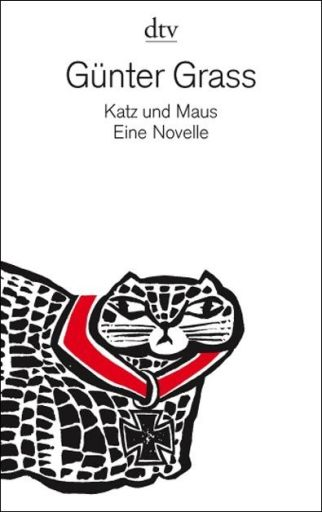
Katz und Maus, second part of the Danzig Trilogy.

== Reactions ==
Grass' publisher said that when the news from Stockholm arrived, he had an appointment with the dentist. Journalists gathered immediately outside his workplace in Lübeck during the day. He informed the media that he was overjoyed and believed Heinrich Böll, the last German to win the Nobel Prize, would have thrilled as well. A few days later, the author spent time signing books at the Frankfurt Book Fair.

Following Grass' confession in his 2006 autobiographical book Peeling the Onion that he joined the Nazi SS in his youth, a member of the German parliament called for Grass to return the award. The Nobel Foundation immediately rejected the idea of revoking the prize, saying "Prize decisions are irreversible". The Nobel Foundation had not revoked a prize in its 105-year history.
