= The Call of the Toad =

The Call of the Toad may refer to:

- The Call of the Toad (novel), a 1992 novel by Günter Grass
  - The Call of the Toad (film), a 2005 film, based on the novel
