= Cat and Mouse (1967 film) =

1967 film directed by Hansjürgen Pohland

- Directed by: Hansjürgen Pohland
- Screenplay by: Michael Hinz; Hansjürgen Pohland
- Based on: Cat and Mouse by Günter Grass
- Produced by: Hansjürgen Pohland
- Starring: Lars Brandt; Peter Brandt; Wolfgang Neuss
- Cinematography: Wolf Wirth
- Edited by: Christa Pohland
- Music by: Attila Zoller
- Production companies: Modern Art Film; Zespól Filmowy Rytm
- Distributed by: Gloria Film
- Release date: 7 February 1967
- Running time: 92 minutes
- Country: West Germany
- Language: German

Cat and Mouse (German: Katz und Maus) is a 1967 West German drama film directed by Hansjürgen Pohland, based on the novel of the same name by Günter Grass, the second book in the Danzig Trilogy. It is about Mahlke, an alienated child in Danzig during World War II.

Pohland was initially only the producer of the film, but took over as director when the intended director died unexpectedly. The film was released in West German cinemas on 7 February 1967.

The film was part of the New German Cinema and became highly controversial in Germany upon its release, largely due to the inclusion of a masturbation scene and the casting of the Social Democratic leader Willy Brandt's sons in the roles of Mahlke at different ages. The film has received little attention after the initial release and has been described as a failure.

== Cast ==
- Lars Brandt as younger Mahlke
- Peter Brandt as older Mahlke
- Claudia Bremer as Tulla
- Wolfgang Neuss as Pilenz
- Ingrid van Bergen as Mahlke's aunt
- Michael Hinz as fighter pilot
- Herbert Weißbach as Klohse
- Helmut Kircher as Kapitänleutnant
- Christof Arnold as Sonntag
- Hans-Peter Brandes as Esch

== Bibliography ==
- Abel, Marco & Fisher, Jaimey (ed.) New German Cinema and Its Global Contexts: A Transnational Art Cinema. Wayne State University Press, 2025.
