= The Box (Grass book) =

2008 autobiographical work by Günter Grass

- Author: Günter Grass
- Original title: Die Box
- Translator: Krishna Winston
- Language: German
- Publisher: Steidl Verlag
- Publication date: 2008
- Publication place: Germany
- English publication date: 2010
- Pages: 215
- ISBN: 3-86521-771-0

The Box (German: Die Box) is a 2008 fictionalised autobiography by the German writer Günter Grass. It has the subtitle "Tales from the Darkroom" ("Dunkelkammergeschichten"). In the narrative, the 80-year-old Grass' eight children, at their father's request, record conversations where they say what they think of him. The Box follows the writer's previous memoir book, Peeling the Onion from 2006, which ended in 1959 with the literary success of The Tin Drum. It was followed by Grimm's Words in 2010.

Though written as if each child were presenting facts about their family's life, it was all written by Grass.

The book's 194 pages were translated by Krishna Winston into English.

== Reception ==
Miranda Seymour of The Daily Telegraph wrote that "The Box is not a wholly successful work. Capricious Mariechen often proves irritatingly whimsical; the Grass children, their voices lapping in and out in a format that comes straight from Virginia Woolf's The Waves, lack individuality. I can remember their names only because I jotted them down; glancing back now at a random page of The Box, I don’t know – or, frankly, care – whether I’m reading the words of Paulchen, Lena, Nana or Pat."

== See also ==
- 2008 in literature
- German literature
