= Crabwalk =

2002 novel by Günter Grass

- First edition (German)
- Author: Günter Grass
- Original title: Im Krebsgang
- Language: German
- Genre: Historical drama
- Publisher: Steidl
- Publication date: 2002
- Publication place: Germany
- Media type: Print (hardback & paperback)
- ISBN: 3-88243-800-2
- OCLC: 231972684
- Preceded by: Dog Years

Crabwalk (2002), published in German as Im Krebsgang, is a novella by German author Günter Grass, who was awarded the Nobel Prize for Literature in 1999. Born in 1927 in the Free City of Danzig (now known as Gdańsk, Poland), Grass explores the effects of the past on the present: in this novel, he interweaves various strands and combines fact and fiction in exploring the lack of attention to German victimhood in their losses in World War II.

He uses fiction to explore the lasting influence of such major events as the early 1945 sinking of the ship Wilhelm Gustloff by a Soviet submarine, in which more than 9300 people died, most civilians and thousands of children. He believes that the failure to recognize the cost of such losses as the ship sinking to the Germans helped create a rise of neo-Nazi movements.

== Title ==
The title, Crabwalk, defined by Grass as "scuttling backward to move forward," refers to various events, some occurring at the same time, which are the same events that would lead to the eventual disaster. Crabwalk might also imply a more abstract glance at history, in order to allow a people to move forward. The protagonist's awkward relationships with his mother and his estranged son, explored via the crabbed process of scouring the wreckage of history for therapeutic insight, is another expression of the title.

== Plot summary ==
The narrator of the novella is journalist Paul Pokriefke. He was born on 30 January 1945, the day that the Wilhelm Gustloff was sunk by a Soviet submarine in the last year of World War II. His young mother-to-be, Tulla Pokriefke (born in Danzig), was featured in two earlier parts of the Danzig Trilogy, Cat and Mouse and Dog Years. She is among the more than 10,000 passengers on the ship, who included a majority of evacuees and some military, and the relatively few hundred survivors. Tulla says in the novel that Paul was born the same moment the ship sank, when she had been rescued and was on board a torpedo boat.

Paul feels that his life is strongly influenced by these events, above all because Tulla repeatedly urges him to fulfill his 'duty' and to commemorate the event in writing. In the course of his research, Paul discovers by chance that his estranged son Konrad (Konny) has taken an interest in the sinking of the Wilhelm Gustloff as an expression of Nazi thinking.

For years Konny had lived with his mother after his parents divorced. He created a website ('blutzeuge.de') by which he explores the 1936 murder of Swiss Nazi leader Wilhelm Gustloff, and the sinking of the ship named for him. He creates a dialogue in which he adopts the role of Gustloff. Another young man, Wolfgang Stremplin, takes the role online of David Frankfurter, Jewish assassin of Gustloff.

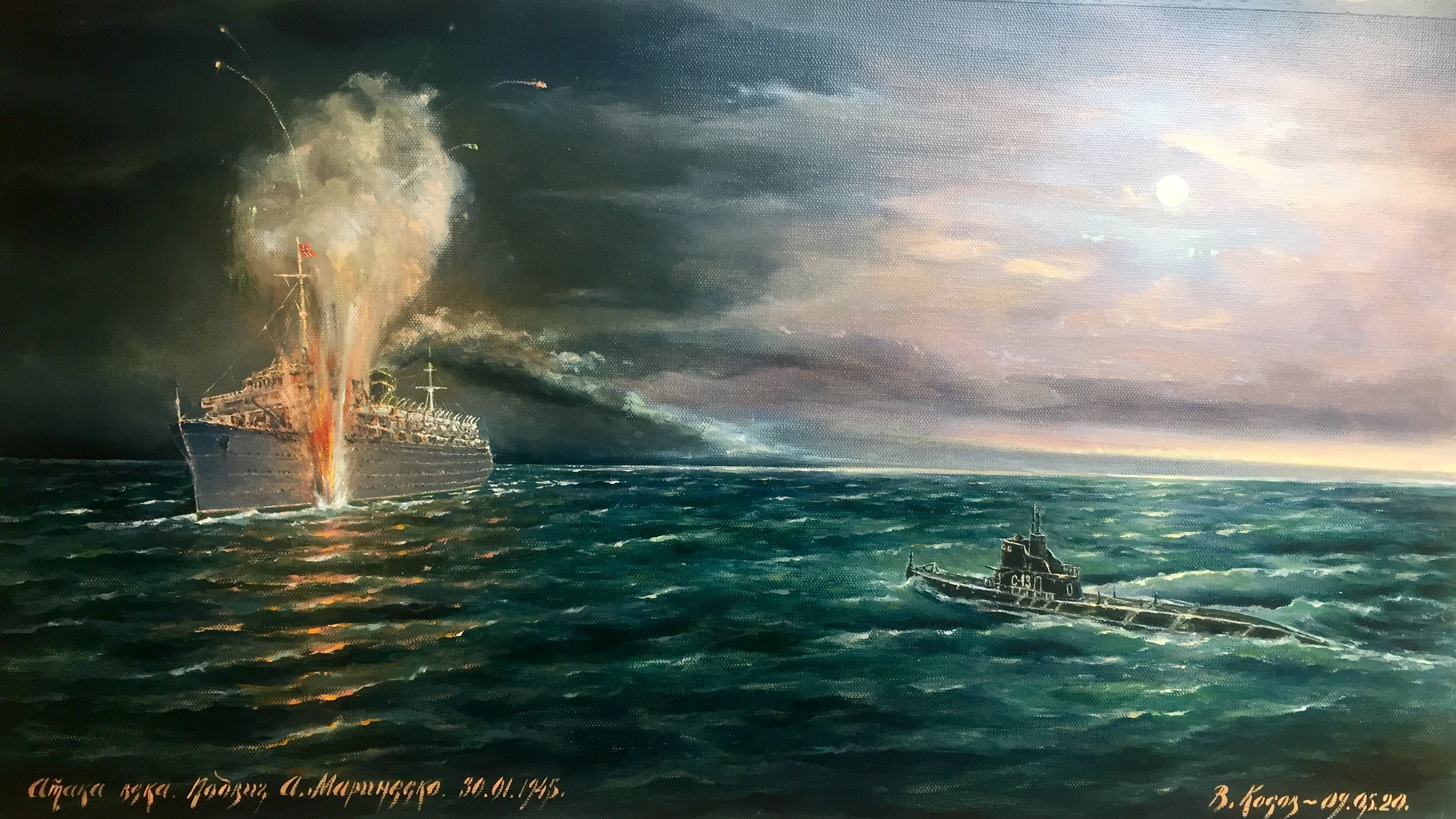
Attack of the century. Death of Wilhelm Gustloff. Vladimir Kosov

The two men eventually meet in person in Schwerin, the hometown of Konny. (A memorial stands to the historic activist Gustloff.) The meeting takes place on 20 April 1997; more than 100 years after Hitler's birth on that date in 1889. Wolfgang takes on a Jewish persona for his role playing. He spits three times on the memorial to Gustloff, a Nazi activist, thus desecrating it in Konny's eyes. Konny shoots him dead, mirroring Frankfurter's shooting of Gustloff. Afterward he surrenders to the police and says, "I shot because I am a German". (By contrast, Frankfurter had said, "I shot because I am a Jew".)

The narrator realises that his imprisoned son has become a new style of martyr. He is celebrated as such by neo-Nazis on the Internet.

== Characters ==
=== Konrad Pokriefke ===
Konrad (known as "Konny") is the son of Paul Pokriefke and Gabi; after his parents' divorce, Konny is brought up by his left-wing mother and has little contact with his father. Highly intelligent, he is characterised as a 'loner' by his parents. He has a very good relationship with his grandmother Tulla, who tells him stories of the ship, and with whom he eventually goes to live.

Via his website, he forms a love-hate relationship with Wolfgang Stremplin: divided by their political views, they are nevertheless connected by similar personalities and a love for table-tennis. At his murder trial, Konny claims to have nothing against Jews, but says that he considers their presence among Aryan populations to be as 'foreign body'. His father believes that the son has a 'slow-burning' hatred for the Jews.

=== Tulla Pokriefke ===
Tulla (short form of Ursula) is short and thin; she was a young woman when her hair turned white after she survived the ship sinking. She is attractive to men even into old age. Politically she is an extremist of varied views: on the one hand she repeatedly praises the 'classless society' of the Strength Through Joy ship and supports her grandson even after he kills his friend; on the other, she became a model functionary of the Socialist Unity Party of Germany in East Germany and wept at the news of Joseph Stalin's death.

Tulla speaks with a strong accent (a form of Low German known as 'Langfursch', after the part of Danzig she is from). As someone who represents a line of continuity with Pokriefke's family's lost Heimat of Danzig, as well as the "lost world" of her ancestral Kashubian people, she has mysterious and almost magical powers of persuasion. Several critics see Tulla as a siren type of character with the power to lure other people, especially men, to her views.

For her, the cruise ship Wilhelm Gustloff, built in 1937 to put the Volksgemeinschaft (people's community) into practice by allowing ordinary Germans to take free vacations abroad, was a floating utopia. For a brief moment it supported a "classless" society where everyone was cared for. Most Germans could not afford a vacation abroad in the interwar period, owing to the undervalued Reichsmark, so a voyage aboard the ship was considered to be a great privilege. After the ship was launched, a number of German families who were considered Volksgenossen ("National Comrades"-i.e people who belonged to the Volksgemeinschaft) were allowed to take a free vacation aboard the Wilhelm Gustloff. The people selected for a voyage on the ship were never Gemeinschaftsfremde ("Community Aliens", i.e those who not belong to the Volksgemeinschaft). The Volksgenossen families selected were meant to provide a good cross-section of German society: families who were working class and middle class; Catholic and Protestant; and from northern and southern Germany, all sailing together on the ship to provide proof that German society under the Nazi regime had indeed become one. For Tulla, the ideal of the Volksgemeinschaft, with German society becoming a gigantic extended family, is her ideal society. She thought this was achieved with the Wilhelm Gustloff.

She was not disturbed by the fact that people considered to be Gemeinschaftsfremde were excluded from the Volksgemeinschaft. Tulla's views are those of the "Hitler Youth generation", who came of age in the 1930s and remembered their youth as a happy time. They often seemed unable to understand why others had more jaundiced memories of the period. Tulla grieves not only the loss of life from the ship sinking, but also the loss of what the ship represented. She sees East Germany as another model of her favorite utopian society, where everyone was alleged to be cared for, although her feelings were stronger for what the Wilhelm Gustloff was said to represent.

She seeks to put the story of the ship into the public domain, as it was long subject to silence. When her attempts to persuade her son to write about the disaster fail, she turns her attention to her grandson, who creates a website about it. After he is threatened by neo-Nazi skinheads, she gives him a gun.

=== The old one ===
The mysterious figure of the old one stands between Grass and the narrator Paul. Belonging to the generation of those who fled to the West after the end of the war, he encourages Paul to write of the sinking because he himself failed to do so. The narrator refers to him as his "employer" or "boss". The possibility of identifying him with Grass serves to prevent the equation of the narrator with the author.

== Analysis ==
The novel suggests that, because Germans and people outside their country have largely ignored the subject of German suffering in World War Two, political extremists have tapped into people feeling overlooked and thus gained a platform in current society. Grass believes that events that represent the full German experience, such as the major losses of thousands of innocent people in the ship sinking, should become part of the popular memory of the past and the war.

Paul Pokriefke, the narrator of Crabwalk, is reluctant to talk about the sinking of the ship. He begins to talk about it only after discovering a neo-Nazi website that uses the sinking as a way to glorify the Third Reich.

Critic Stephen Brase suggests that the main theme of the novel is parental (and generational) failure, as Paul and his ex-wife Gabi are unable to prevent their son from becoming a Nazi. Brase considered the characters of Paul and Gabi to be emblematic of the post-war generation who came of age in the 1960s and wanted to create a better Germany, but were unable to make lasting positive changes. Grass portrayed Paul as well-meaning, but unable to make the changes he wants because for the first half of the novel he cannot speak of the sinking of the Wilhelm Gustloff. Even when Paul does speak of the sinking, he stresses that some of its aspects, such as the deaths of the passengers in the interior, who were unable to escape because the ship sank rapidly and in icy waters, are simply too horrible to put into words. In a different way, the parents of Wolfgang Stremplin are shown as having failed because their son's philo-Semitism, a result of guilt over the Holocaust, is portrayed as deeply felt but also somewhat silly and absurd. The last lines of the novel are: "It doesn't end. It will never end".

In a critical 2002 review in Die Zeit, Thomas Schmitt rejected Grass's thesis of a "national taboo" against the memory of German victimization in the war. He notes that families of Germans who fled or were expelled from their longtime homes in other national territories in the postwar period have kept alive the memories of these lost homelands. He also noted that conservative German historians have always written at length about the losses of Germans, including deaths in the military, civilian victims of bombed cities or sunk ships, and the losses of tens of thousands who were expelled from Eastern Europe and often attacked along the way.

But Schmitt also accepted that aspects of recent German history made it difficult for the people to incorporate the memory of German victimization into their memory of the past. Schmitt noted that the "68ers", as the generation who came of age in the late 1960s are known, tended to point an accusing finger at their parents and grandparents for all the things that they did and did not do in the Nazi era. The 68ers were reluctant to accept the image of their parents/grandparents as victims. Schmitt also noted that the cause of expellees was championed by the West German government under Konrad Adenauer, who rejected the Oder-Neisse line, but the Ostpolitik of Willy Brandt and the acceptance of the Oder-Neisse line in 1970 resulted in the West German state refusing expellees and their demands for the "right to a homeland". Schmitt noted that the expellee groups hurt their cause by demands for a revanchist foreign policy directed at taking back parts of Poland that Germany had once controlled. This made the memory of their suffering difficult to incorporate into the memory of the past in an acceptable way. For all these reasons, Schmitt believed that Crabwalk had come too late, and that it was unlikely to influence the memory of the past in the way that Grass wanted.

While acknowledging the terrible loss of life in the ship sinking Schmitt noted that the next day, a Nazi-directed death march ended in the same area, with a massacre of survivors at the edge of the sea. The SS had forced the inmates of Stutthof concentration camp (outside of Danzig) on a death march that at the shore of the Baltic Sea. Survivors were shot down there into the crashing waves.

Schmitt also noted that the Wilhelm Gustloff was carrying military personnel and weapons, making it a legitimate wartime target for the Soviets under international law. While most of the passengers were civilians, the ship did not carry Red Cross markings. By contrast, the Stutthof death march was an act of genocide. Schmitt argued that the sinking of the ship was not an act of genocide and should not be remembered as comparable to the death march.

Grass was among the "Flakhelfer generation", those Germans under the Third Reich who were too young to be drafted into the Wehrmacht, but were usually assigned as gunner assistants to Luftwaffe anti-aircraft batteries that were used against the Allied bombers during the strategical bombing offensive.

Critic Fritz J. Raddatz, one of the leaders of the student protests of the late 1960s, said in a 2006 interview that Grass was too harsh in Crabwalk towards the "68ers". He said that Grass's portrayal of their efforts to change German society as a failure was most unfair. Raddatz argued that the portrayal of the "68ers" as well meaning but ineffectual intellectuals, due to their own flaws, was distorted and reflected Grass's personal disapproval of the protest movements in the 1960s.

Many reviewers felt that the "spectacular success" of Crabwalk would lead to a new national discourse that would place the image of Germans as victims of the war as the dominant memory of the past. German journalist Ralph Giordano, who suffered persecution in the Nazi era for having a Jewish mother, ranked Crabwalk as one of Grass's best novels. He agreed that events such as the sinking of the Wilhelm Gustloff should be remembered and mourned as a terrible chapter of the war. But, Giordano insisted that the war begun by Germany was the cause of ethnic Germans being expelled from Poland and elsewhere in Eastern Europe. He noted that the 1950 charter of the main expellee group was an "instrument perfectly suited for repressing historical facts", as it suggested that Poland had attacked Germany in 1939, rather than the facts.

Giordano argued that Grass's intentions in Crabwalk were honorable, but his argument could be distorted into an assertion of moral equivalence, as if there were no differences between the actions of the Axis and Allied states. He opposed this way of rendering the past.

Critic Siegfrid Mews wrote that British reviewers of Crabwalk had praised the novel for its attention to the "forgotten victims of ethnic cleansing", and suggested that the "sense of loss" that the novel embraced was a sign of the growing "normalisation of Germany". A review in the conservative Daily Telegraph, noted that the "9, 000 people who died [on the Wilhelm Gustloff]-six times more than in the Titanic disaster-were largely ignored by the country's literary elite and to an extent by the historians". Mews noted that many British reviewers seemed to embrace the novel's message that the story of German wartime should be part of the memory of the past in a manner that seemed to be contrary to Grass's intentions.'

British critic Julian Preece noted that the sinking in Crabwalk became a symbol for Der Flucht ("The Flight") - the massive, chaotic and catastrophic flight of Germans from the eastern parts of Germany in the winter of 1944-1945 as the Red Army advanced into the Reich toward Berlin. Though Grass noted there were soldiers abroad the Wilhelm Gustloff, he emphasized that the majority of dead were civilians, and that Captain Marinesko of the Soviet submarine S-13 had no reason to believe that the cruise ship was anything other than a civilian ship when he torpedoed it. Preece believed that Grass thought the ship sinking to be unjustified.

In the novel, Grass notes that the story of the sinking was forbidden in East Germany. He compared this to apparent prohibitions in West Germany against discussing German victimization in the war since the Brandt era.

The novel explores Paul Pokriefke's attempts to sort out the various meanings attached to the sinking, including the Soviet viewpoint as represented by Captain Marinesko. On the wrong side of politics, he was sentenced and imprisoned in a Siberian Gulag camp for a period after the war. In the novel, he is portrayed as both a perpetrator and a victim, providing a degree of moral ambiguity. Other German accounts have represented him as a heartles monster who sent some 9, 600 people to their deaths by sinking the ship.

Notably, the book correctly notes that the three captains commanding the ship were criminally negligent in not having enough lifeboats aboard to accommodate the overloaded ship. The decision to keep the ship's lights on at night, illuminating it and creating higher risk, has never been explained. Had the Wilhelm Gustloff had the proper number of lifeboats, more lives would have been saved while if the lights had been turned off, the ship might very well had escaped been sunk altogether.

Most of the children went down with the ship and died. Grass incorporated the findings that the three captains all had places in the lifeboats.

Preece felt that the most vivid parts of Crabwalk were the "death in the snow" segments, tracing the historic Der Flucht as millions of German civilians trekked westwards in panic-stricken columns over the snow and ice in the winter of 1944-45 to escape the invading Soviet troops. Many dropped dead during their epic flight. Preece says that the debate about the assassination of Wilhelm Gustloff in Switzerland, which takes up much of the novel, was "...really a distraction from the horror in the snow experienced by the refugees in the winter treks to the west, which claimed the lives of so many in such degrading circumstances".

South African novelist J. M. Coetzee said that Tulla was Grass's most memorable character. Despite her questionable political views she is undeniably a victim; she says of the sinking:

"A thing like that you can never forget. It never leaves you. It's not just in my dreams, that cry [of passengers drowning in the Baltic] that spread over the waters...And of them little children among the ice floes".

Coetzee said that Tulla's politics may be "ugly" and "unrefined", but were "deeply felt". He further said that Grass made a "considered argument" that people such as Tulla should be allowed "to have their heroes and martyrs and memorials and ceremonies of remembrance", as repression of any kind leads to "unpredictable consequences".
