= The Flounder =

1977 novel by Günter Grass

- First edition (German)
- Author: Günter Grass
- Original title: Der Butt
- Translator: Ralph Manheim
- Language: German
- Publisher: Luchterhand
- Publication date: August 1977
- Publication place: West Germany
- English publication date: November 1978
- Pages: 693
- ISBN: 3-472-86069-3

The Flounder (German: Der Butt, pronounced [deːɐ̯ bʊt]) is a 1977 novel by the German writer Günter Grass. It is loosely based on the fairy tale "The Fisherman and His Wife".

== Themes ==
Grass said, "The Flounder is about women and food, but it is also about women and war, including what women have done against war – unfortunately, mostly silence." Regarding his view on the human sexes and its influence on the novel, Grass said, "Most women who read the book all the way through like it. Those in the women's liberation movement who say there is no difference between men and women don't like it. I like the difference – I hate those who don't like the difference between men and women."

The key theme of the book is of woman's historical contributions in both fact and fiction, ranging from the early goddesses of the matriarchial Stone Age society by the Vistula River, to the Grimm Brothers' fairy tale, "The Fisherman and His Wife", to the novel’s contemporary "women’s' libbers" (as phrased in the English translation). The Flounder plays a central role as agent and provocateur in the cause of either sex throughout.

== Writing process ==
Grass came up with the idea for the book while campaigning in the late 1960s for the politician Willy Brandt. He said that during the campaign, he was "constantly being bombarded by second-hand language." He got an urge to write what would become The Flounder, and took five years to complete the novel.

He rewrote the more than 500-page novel three times. Grass has said his structure of nine chapters was deliberate, to "pay homage to the nine months of pregnancy." At the same time, he has acknowledged criticizing some aspects of radical feminism.

== Publication ==
The novel was published in August 1977 through Luchterhand, with a first edition of 100,000 copies. One of Luchterhand's ways to market the book was to send out 4000 preview copies to selected people. Grass toured extensively with public readings of the book during the eight weeks leading up to the release; upon the publication date, Grass had read extracts for a total of 10,000 people. The book dominated the German bestseller chart for several months. By October 1977, nearly 250,000 copies had been sold. An English translation by Ralph Manheim was published in the United Kingdom and United States in November 1978.

In 1983 the interpolated poems were published together with etchings as Ach Butt, dein Märchen geht böse aus: Gedichte und Radierungen; a bilingual edition with the same title came out in 1999.

== Reception ==
William Cloonan of Boston Review wrote that The Flounder marks a new direction in Grass' writing, partially because it is not concerned with World War II like the author's previous books:

But Grass's other concerns, his strengths, and weaknesses, are very much in evidence. Foremost among them is the tension between his pedagogical and artistic instincts. The Flounder is Grass's teacher par excellence and with him the question, hinted at in Local Anaesthetic, 'can one trust one's teacher,' is explicit." Cloonan also wrote: "With the Flounder, Gunter Grass creates a character whose combination of intelligence, amorality, self-irony, and curiosity makes him almost the equal of Oskar [in The Tin Drum]. Indeed, there is much brilliant writing in The Flounder. For a writer justly famous for extended humorous and grotesque scenes, Grass also has a flair for one-liners.

Herbert Mitgang of the New York Times noted that the novel was about "women, men and the state of the world" and since all are controversial, so was the reaction to Grass' novel. It defies an easy summary, as the narrator tells of his many lives as a husband, including as a lover to 11 women cooks.

A reviewer for Kirkus Reviews argued that “the bulk and density can drown you. To Grass' credit, however, he's thrown himself totally into this novel (as he hasn't done in a while). Ambitious readers can plunge into this Hood-like phantasmagoria of the battle-of-the-sexes; all readers can stand on the shore and admire some of Grass' inventive ripples.”

== See also ==
- 1977 in literature
- German literature
