= Local Anaesthetic (novel) =

1969 novel by Günter Grass

- First edition
- Author: Günter Grass
- Original title: Örtlich betäubt
- Translator: Ralph Manheim
- Language: German
- Publisher: Luchterhand
- Publication date: 1969
- Publication place: West Germany
- English publication date: 1970
- Pages: 358

Local Anaesthetic (German: Örtlich betäubt) is a 1969 novel by the German writer Günter Grass. It tells the story of an idealistic high-school teacher who believes society, like a pupil, is learning from experience and reason.

== Plot and content ==
Eberhard Starusch is a 40-year-old teacher of German and history who lives in West Berlin and acts as the tragicomic centre of the novel. In the background one of his students, Phillipp Scherbaum, is planning to set fire to his dog Max on the Kurfurstendamm as a protest against the US involvement in the Vietnam War. Starusch undergoes a long sequence of dental operations in 1967 in a surgery where television is used as a method of distracting patients from the operations and the pain that is involved in them, with the resultant televisual images merging and melding into his consciousness and reflections. Starusch recounts his own meditations upon the political past and the post-war situation in Adenauer's Germany and the inadequacy, from his perspective, of both Left and Right political ideologies and party alignments in that period (with tooth decay acting as a metaphor for wider spiritual and political decay). The book is largely an internal monologue from Starusch's perspective, punctuated only on limited occasions by questions and observations from his dentist.

== Context and influences ==
Grass had been deeply moved after learning about the Hübener Group, three teenage Mormons who distributed anti-Nazi material inspired by BBC London radio broadcasts and were arrested by the Gestapo in Hamburg. Two were released to labor camps, but the author himself, Helmuth Hübener, was executed by guillotine as a 17-year-old traitor to the Reich. Hitler personally refused to reduce or commute the sentence. When interviewed for the documentary Truth & Conviction (see external link below), Grass said it continually tore at him that he and other Germans could not somehow have dug deeper, seen through the Nazi deception sooner and found the courage to stand up. It eventually helped Grass sublimate his anguish to convert it into a novel.

== Critical reception ==
Anatole Broyard wrote in The New York Times that "There is little in Grass's previous books to prepare us for this one. Where they were sprawling and self-indulgent, Local Anaesthetic is lean and ironic." Broyard wrote that the author "unmercifully satirizes the impotence, the masochism, the desperate expedients, that make the lot of the liberal such a hard one". About the technical aspects, he wrote that "Grass has possessed himself of everything fiction has learned in the past two decades- and he uses that knowledge so well that the book is a brilliant tour de force. With this important difference: unlike most tours de force, it never condescends to its content. Every invention satisfies a need and comes out sounding natural."

== See also ==
- 1969 in literature
- German literature
