= The Call of the Toad (film) =

2005 Polish film by Robert Gliński

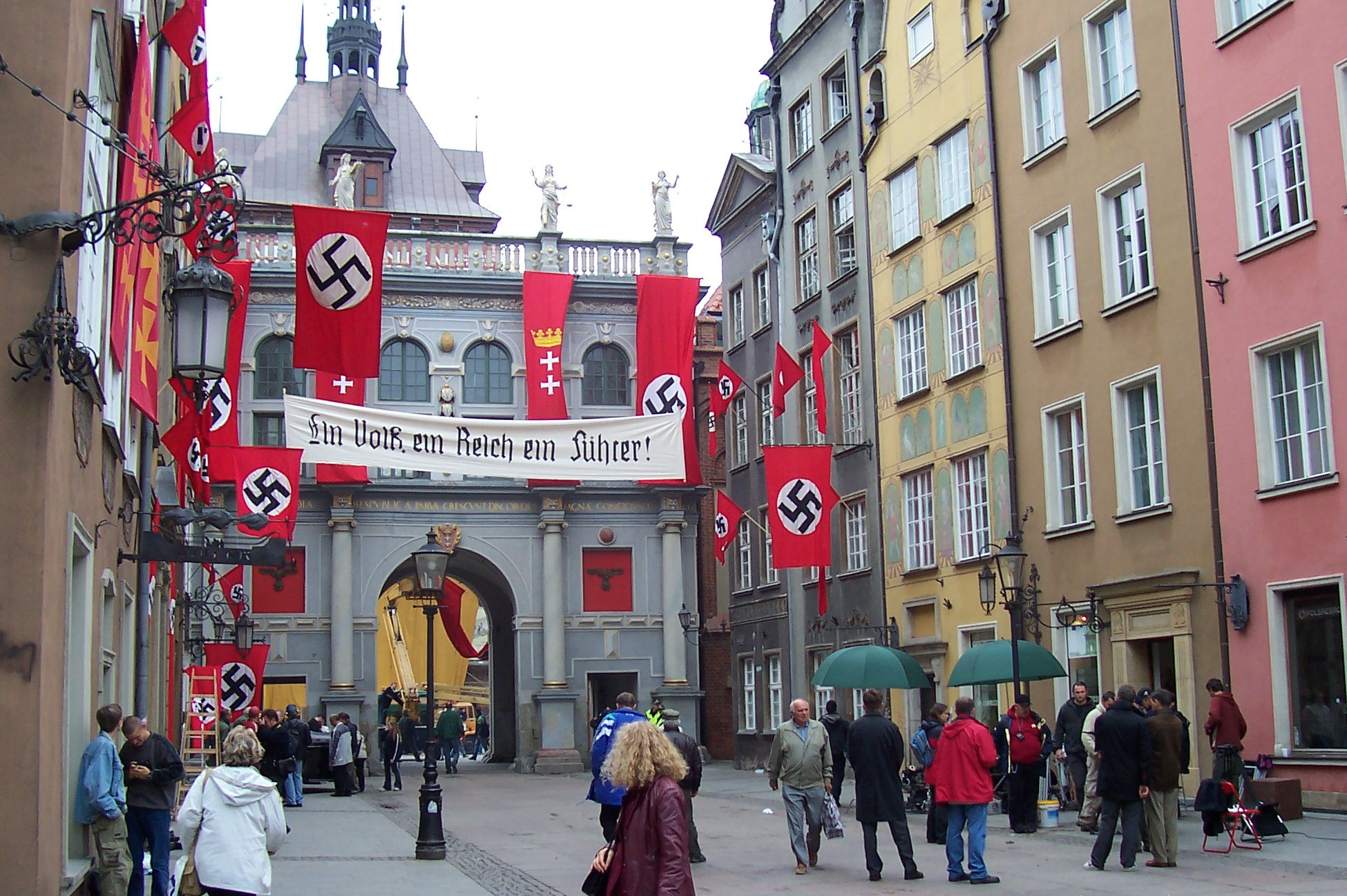
- Directed by: Robert Gliński
- Written by: Klaus Richter; Pawel Huelle; Cezary Harasimowicz
- Based on: The Call of the Toad by Günter Grass
- Produced by: Regina Ziegler; Elke Ried; Ursual Vossen; Mike Downey; Sam Taylor; Henryk Romanowski
- Starring: Matthias Habich; Krystyna Janda
- Cinematography: Jacek Petrycki
- Edited by: Krzysztof Szpetmanski
- Music by: Richard G. Mitchell
- Release dates: 22 September 2005 (Germany); 23 September 2005 (Poland)
- Running time: 98 minutes
- Countries: Germany; Poland
- Languages: German; Polish; English

The Call of the Toad is a film released in 2005 that tells the love story between a German man and a Polish woman who become caught up in the advent of modern capitalism in Poland. It is based on the novel The Call of the Toad written by Günter Grass.

== Synopsis ==
In Gdańsk, Poland, in 1989, Alexander Reschke and Alexandra Piatkowska first meet on their way to a cemetery. Both are survivors from the end of World War II when many people from Poland and Germany were displaced as borders were re-drawn according to new treaties.

But they discover that displacement and war is not all they have in common. They have both been widowed and due to their upheaval - they share the belief that survivors such as themselves should have the right to be returned home for burial.

As their love affair grows, their ambitions become entwined. The pair establishes a Cemetery of Reconciliation to show that old hatreds are now dead. They form a company that arranges for survivors to be buried in their original country but as the money rolls in, their good intentions are corrupted.

== Cast ==
- Krystyna Janda as Aleksandra Piatkowska
- Matthias Habich as Alexander Reschke
- Dorothea Walda as Erna Brakup
- Bhasker Patel as Chatterjee
- Udo Samel as Vielbrand
- Marek Kondrat as Marczak
- Mareike Carrière as Johanna Detlaff

== Awards ==
- Nominated Best Actress, Polish Film Awards.
- Nominated Best Film Score, Polish Film Awards.
- Nominated Best Production Design, Polish Film Awards.
- Nominated Best Supporting Actor, Polish Film Awards.
