= The Rat (novel) =

1986 novel by Günter Grass

- Cover of the first edition
- Author: Günter Grass
- Original title: Die Rättin
- Translator: Ralph Manheim
- Language: German
- Publisher: Luchterhand
- Publication date: 1986
- Publication place: West Germany
- English publication date: 1987
- Media type: Print (Hardcover and Paperback)
- Pages: 504
- ISBN: 3-472-86624-1

The Rat (German: Die Rättin, literally The Ratess) is a 1986 novel by the German writer Günter Grass.

== Structure and content ==
The plot is composed of many narrative strands and oscillates between fairytale, travelogue and surreal novel. It also contains cinematic perspectives and some poems. Grass incorporates some narrative threads of his success novels The Tin Drum as well as the Butt; further passages on maritime disasters, the sinking of the Wilhelm Gustloff, anticipate aspects of his book Crabwalk.

Grass has conceived the novel as a counter-image to Gotthold Ephraim Lessing's picture of the education of the human race: Humanity (Grass used deliberately old-fashioned word "mankind") have indeed learned "the virtue to eat with spoons, diligently the subjunctive and practice tolerance", all enlightenment but not their tendency to get their violence under control.

In the dreams of the narrator, who seems to be in a spaceship orbiting the devastated earth, a speaking female rat compels the narrator to review the destruction of humanity, and follow their dominant position by rats. Rats build accordingly, in a world destroyed through deforestation, pollution, and nuclear warfare, a new civilization based on solidarity.

Against this vision, the narrator developed his own stories leading up to the nuclear apocalypse, partly as film scripts for the including by porn series to Medienzar Oskar Matzerath, the painter Lothar Malskat and the restoration of the 50s, from the dead forests and the dying power of Fairy Tales and five beloved women who make up the Baltic officially investigating the local jellyfish population and secretly in search of the legendary Vineta as a place of female utopia. In addition, among other things, the Smurfs are in the German forest road and the Grimm brothers temporarily take over the government.

He lived through the (alleged) downfall of mankind once again based on the fates of different people. In a final conversation between the Rats and the narrator, the foregoing is in jeopardy. The two can not agree whether the She-rat is just a dream of the narrator, or whether this is - along with the rest of humanity - merely a figment of the imagination of remaining on earth rat. The first third initially original, imaginatively laid possibilities of his polyphonic narrative concept is not further developed and used in the other part.

== Background and references ==
The Chernobyl nuclear disaster, a few months after the book, gave the author a certain daily topicality. Grass took, among others, the inclusion of genetically modified rat-men, the "Watsoncricks" further controversies about the genetic engineering terms. The name alludes to the Watson Crick Nobel Prize in Medicine, and the discoverers of the molecular structure of deoxyribonucleic acid (DNA), Francis Crick and James Watson.

== Reception ==
Janette Turner Hospital of The New York Times called the book an "exhilarating, exhausting, maddening, brilliant, funny and profoundly disturbing novel".

== See also ==
- 1986 in literature
- German literature
