= Hansjürgen Pohland =

German film director and producer

Hansjürgen Pohland (December 4, 1934 – May 17, 2014) was a German film director and producer, also credited as Jason Pohland. He signed the 1962 Oberhausen Manifesto and later directed features such as Tobby (1961) and Cat and Mouse (1967).

== Early life and education ==
Pohland was born in Berlin on December 4, 1934.

At the age of twenty-one, he founded the production company Pohland Film, through which he made more than thirty short documentaries before moving into feature production.

== Career ==
Pohland’s first feature, the hybrid fiction-documentary Tobby (1961), won the directing prize at the inaugural Mannheim Film Festival. In 1962 Pohland was the producer of Herbert Vesely's film The Bread of Those Early Years. In 1964 he produced Michael Pfleghar's Dead Woman from Beverly Hills, a German–U.S. co-production filmed on location in Hollywood. Der Spiegel detailed the guerrilla shooting methods and disputes with local trade unions. Pohland’s second feature as director, Cat and Mouse (1967), adapted the novella by Günter Grass. The film drew public criticism for depictions of the military and became the subject of parliamentary debate.

Further directing credits include Tamara (1968), the crime satire Auf Sch**ßer schießt man nicht (1969), and the rock-festival documentary Love and Music/Stamping Ground (1971, co-directed).

His science-fiction Why the UFOs Steal Our Lettuce (1979) marked his last commercial feature before a long hiatus. He returned with the documentary Die Rebellen von Oberhausen (2012), produced for the fiftieth anniversary of the Oberhausen Manifesto.

Pohland was a founding member of the Friends of the German Kinematheque and maintained a private archive, Modern Art Film, of his papers and negatives.

== Filmography ==
- Shadows (1960)
- Tobby (1961)
- The Bread of Those Early Years (1962)
- Dead Women from Beverly Hills (1964)
- Serenade for Two Spies (1965)
- Katz und Maus (1967)
- Dieser Mann und Deutschland, co-director Heinz von Cramer (1967, TV film)
- Tamara (1968)
- Auf Sch**ßer schießt man nicht (1969)
- Love and Music / Stamping Ground (1971, co-directed)
- The Naked Wytche (1970)
- Things Fall Apart (1971)
- Second Spring. (1975)
- Why the UFOs Steal Our Lettuce (1980)
- Die Rebellen von Oberhausen (2012`)

== See also ==
- New German Cinema
