= Knulp =

1915 novella by Hermann Hesse

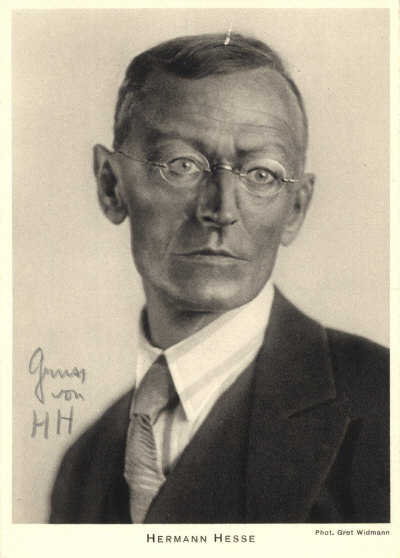
- Photograph of Hesse by Gret Widmann. Signed by Hesse in pencil, 'Gruss von H H' (before 1931)
- Author: Hermann Hesse
- Translator: Ralph Manheim
- Language: German
- Series: "Gerbersau" tales
- Publisher: S. Fischer Verlag
- Publication date: 1915
- Publication place: Germany
- English publication date: 1971

Knulp : Three Tales from the Life of Knulp (Knulp : Drei Geschichten aus dem Leben Knulps.) is a novella by Hermann Hesse, published in 1915 by S. Fischer Verlag. The three stories about a tramp, Knulp, which Hesse wrote between 1907 and 1914, are part of his "Gerbersau" tales.

== Plot summary ==
=== Early Spring ===
During harsh weather in mid-February, Knulp is discharged from the hospital, but soon becomes sick again. He decides to go to the home of a tanner named Emil Rothfuss, in the town of Lächstetten. Years ago, Knulp had traveled with the tanner, and now requests an empty bed. He avoids promising the length of his stay, as it is very important for him to be able to spend the following days at his leisure. He also asks the tanner to write an entry into his journeyman's log. The previous log entries are made up by Knulp such that they describe his past as being very industrious.

After a day of resting in bed, he sneaks out of the house and wanders around the city in the evening. He has conversations with some of the people he meets. The next day he also gets to know Bärbele by chatting window to window with her. She is a young girl from the Black Forest who only started working in Lächstetten a week ago. Knulp gains her trust through his skillful whistling.

The next morning, he explores the town at length. He refreshes old, loose acquaintances and seeks out conversations with the craftsmen everywhere. As he knows a little about all the trades and is familiar with their jargon and manners, he is always happy to be mistaken for one of them. An old acquaintance of Knulp, Schlotterbeck, a tailor with many children who has also settled in Lächstetten envies Knulp because he is so carefree. Knulp advises the tailor that he should be happy to have these children and tells him that he himself has a two-year-old son, but that he was adopted by strangers after his mother's death because his paternity was concealed. Knulp, therefore can not have contact with his son and can only watch him from afar on occasion. As he continues to walk through the town he learns about the local news and then tells the news about other places. He rejoices in the loose bond that connects him as an old acquaintance with the life of the sedentary people. He also finds out where the dancing will take place that evening and, with a lot of persuasion, manages to invite Bärbele. This is far more interesting to him than the intrusions of the life-hungry tanner's wife, from whom he manages to escape. He also turns down an invitation from the Rothfuß couple, who want to spend the evening with Knulp, with a cheap excuse. Instead, he goes to the dance floor with Bärbele in the mild evening. Knulp and Bärbele dance together. He follows her almost to her door. They kiss each other goodbye. That evening, Bärbele realizes that Knulp is poor. She gives him a coin from her small purse. Knulp senses spring and has to wander. The topology of the landscape around Lächstetten, including all the accommodation options etc., is reliably stored in the tramp's intact memory, which he had already trained at Latin school as a child.

=== My Memory of Knulp ===
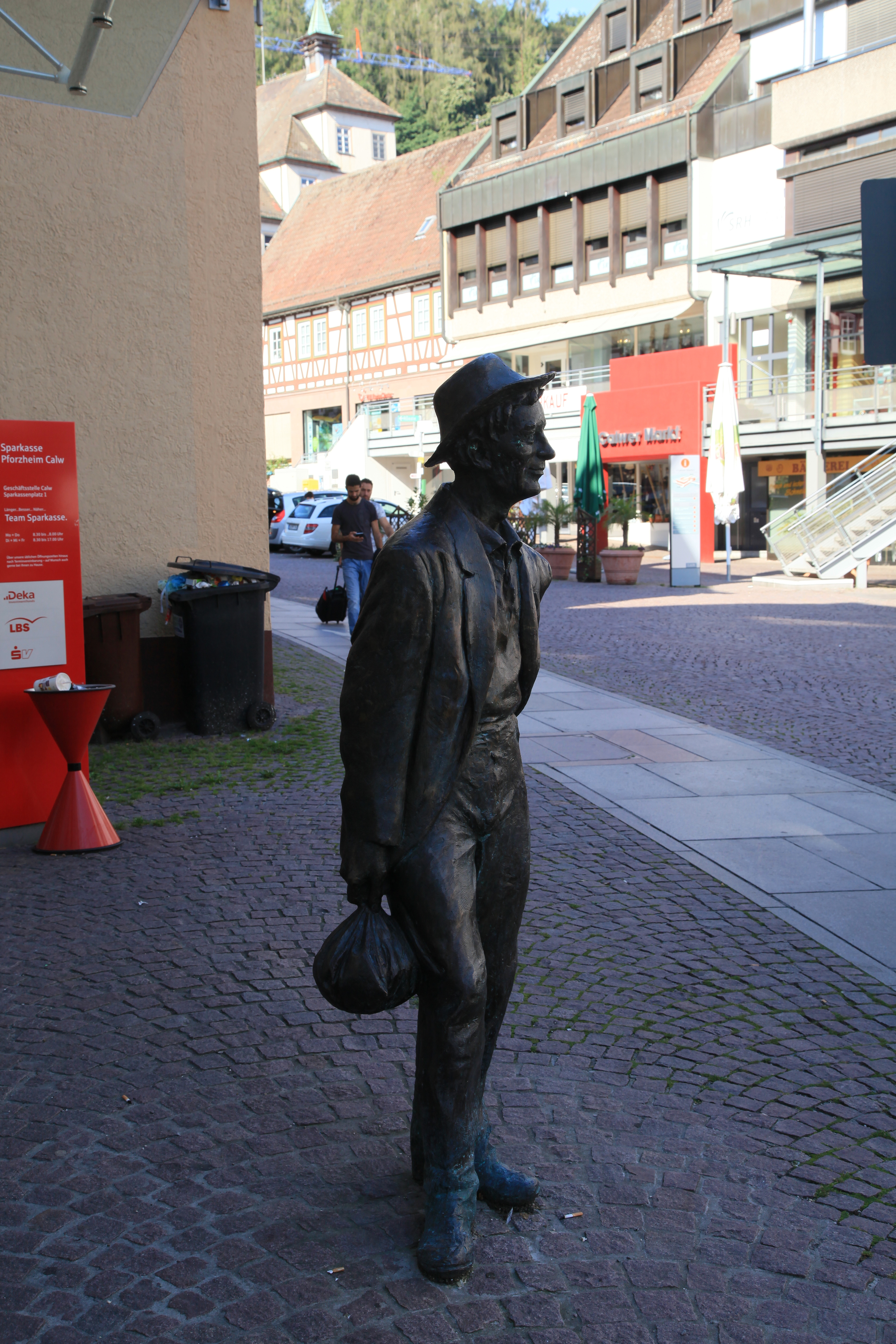
"Knulp", statue by Friedhelm Zilly, 2010, Calw, Germany

The narrator is on the move with Knulp in the hot summer. In a farming village, Knulp amuses a few young girls with his antics and tricks. The narrator holds back. The two itinerant boys climb over the cemetery wall. Knulp breaks off a cemetery flower and puts it on his hat. Knulp philosophizes in the grass. The beautiful is always ephemeral. Before they spend the night outdoors, Knulp shares one of his dreams. It is about the unattainability of what was once familiar. He left his parents and his childhood sweetheart. Unfortunately, there is nothing he can do about it. He reflects on the diversity of souls. What he considers the most important thing about himself, perhaps his soul, his parents find secondary. Children can inherit many qualities from their parents, but not their soul. Everyone has their own.

Knulp proudly greets the new day by singing to the sun. The two wandering boys are jolly all summer long. When the muggy evening comes, the narrator becomes more and more cheerful and Knulp more and more quiet. The next morning, the narrator wakes up late and Knulp is gone. The narrator is overcome by that loneliness that Knulp was talking about all the time. Everyone is alone.

=== The End ===
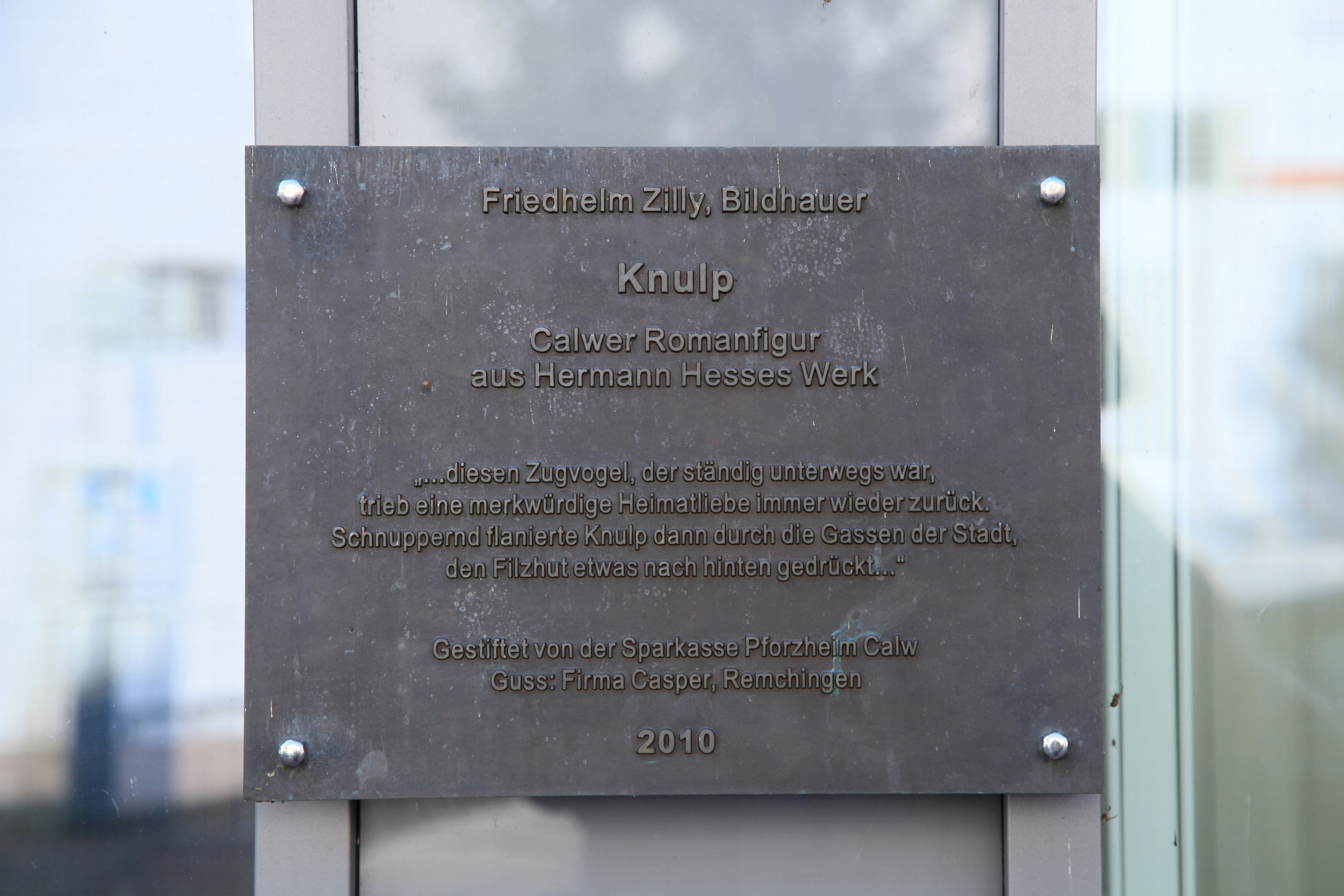
Plaque describing the Knulp statue, Calw, Germany

In October, Knulp walks to his birthplace in Gerbersau, when a friend from the Latin school approaches him. This country doctor Dr. Machold recognizes that Knulp has a lung disease and doesn't belong on the street. Dr. Machold copied Knulp's work at the time. Now he wants to return the favor. So he takes Knulp home and puts him to bed because Knulp's disease is advanced. Dr. Machold wants to get Knulp at the Oberstetten hospital, but Knulp wants to go to his birthplace. Dr. Machold sets it up. Before the carriage ride to Gerbersau, Dr. Machold asks why the talented Knulp did not use his gifts in a demanding job but only used them for himself. Knulp corrects that others have enjoyed his jokes too. As for the question, Knulp answers why he left the Latin school back then. When he was almost 13, he loved Franziska. Franziska, who was two years older than him, didn't like students. Knulp desperately wanted to be her sweetheart and dropped out of Latin school. Franziska took another. From then on, Knulp went downhill. Although he still had acquaintances and lovers, he was no longer able to rely on someone's word or bind himself to a word. He has experienced a lot of freedom and beauty but has always remained alone.

The carriage ride to the Gerbersau hospital begins. Knulp allows himself to be driven to his birthplace, but stays away from the hospital. Instead, he seeks out the places of his childhood – recognizes some things that still exist, mourns things that have disappeared forever. After asking questions and finding out that Franziska is no longer alive, he leaves town. A stone cutter he meets - they also know each other from before - tells him that he will have to answer for his life when it comes to dying, and despite his talents, nothing has become of him. Knulp hopes for a God who won't ask him why he didn't become a magistrate but instead will take him, the childlike, in a friendly manner.

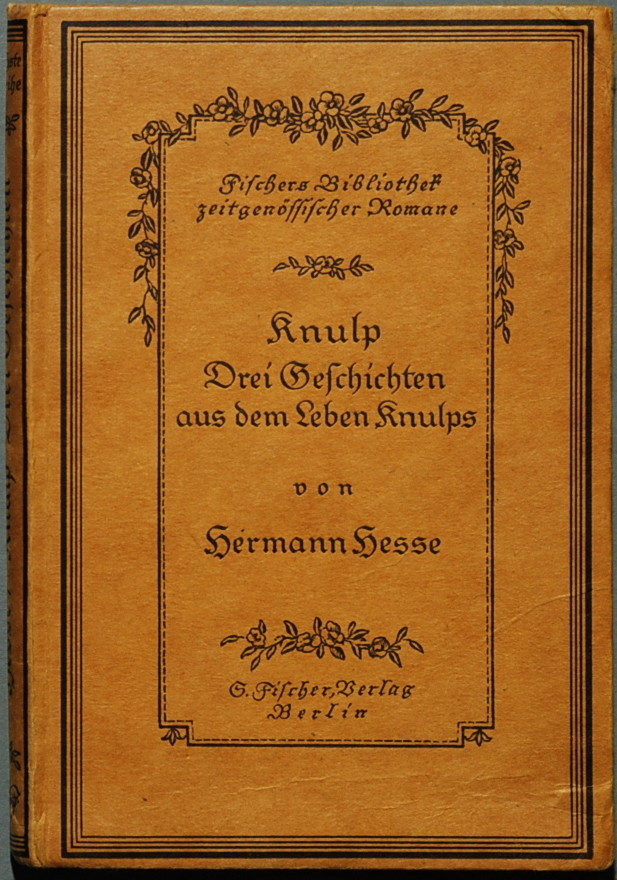
First edition, 1915

It drives the vagabond back onto the street. For two weeks he has been circling Gerbersau on foot. When winter sets in with snowdrifts, Knulp comes to the end of the road. He's dead tired and spitting up blood. In his thoughts, he stands before God and talks to him incessantly. Knulp complains about the futility of his failed life and thinks it better end soon. God reminds him of many happy, beautiful times. Knulp also regrets his wickedness towards Lisabeth, whom he sees with their boy in her arms. God counters that she has never been angry with him and has received much good from him, which outweighs the pain inflicted on her. Knulp had to be carefree and a wanderer in order to be able to carry some childlike joy and children's laughter everywhere.

God stands by his side and receives him:

"Look," said God, "I couldn't use you any other way than the way you are. You have wandered in my name and have always had to bring a little homesickness for freedom to the settled people. You have done foolish things and been mocked in my name; I myself was mocked in you and loved in you. After all, you are my child and my brother and a part of me, and you have tasted nothing and suffered nothing that I did not experience with you."

"Yes," said Knulp, nodding his head heavily. "Yes, it's like that, I've actually always known it."

== Testimonies ==
Stefan Zweig : "(...) Knulp, this lonely latecomer of a romantic world, seems to me an imperishable piece of Little Germany, a dreamy romantic picture and at the same time full of pure music like a folk song."

Hermann Hesse, 1935 in a letter to a reader: "Contrary to some fashions, I do not consider it the poet's task to set standards for life and humanity for his readers and to be omniscient and authoritative. The poet portrays what attracts him, and characters like Knulp are very attractive to me. They are not "useful", but they do very little harm, much less than some useful ones, and it is not my business to judge them. Rather, I believe: if talented and inspired people like Knulp find no place in their environment, then the environment is just as complicit as Knulp himself."

According to Theodore Ziolkowski, Knulp's "absolute freedom is always accompanied by a sense of guilt". Knulp wanted to bring "a little homesickness for freedom" into the everyday life of the "normal", the dutiful. But Knulp finally had to resign himself to the fact that he hadn't achieved "anything really valuable" for "ordinary people".

== English translations ==
1929: Basil Creighton (translated as Knulp : Three Tales from the Life of Knulp)

1971: Ralph Manheim (translated as Knulp : Three Tales from the Life of Knulp)

== Editions ==
First edition: Knulp. Drei Geschichten aus dem Leben Knulps. (Knulp. Three stories from Knulp's life.) Fischer, Berlin 1915.

Knulp. With 16 lithographs by Karl Walser, S.Fischer Verlag, Berlin 1922

Knulp. Drei Geschichten aus dem Leben Knulps. (Knulp. Three stories from Knulp's life.) With drawings by Niklaus Stoecklin, Fretz & Wasmuth, Zurich 1944.

Knulp. Drei Geschichten aus dem Leben Knulps. (Knulp. Three stories from Knulp's life.) With 16 lithographs by Karl Walser. Suhrkamp, Frankfurt am Main 1963. 21st edition. Suhrkamp, Frankfurt am Main 1988, ISBN 3518010751

Knulp. Drei Geschichten aus dem Leben Knulps. (Knulp. Three stories from Knulp's life.) Suhrkamp, Frankfurt am Main 1988, ISBN 3518380710

== Bibliography ==
- Decker, Gunnar (2012). Hermann Hesse (in German). München: Hanser. ISBN 978-3-446-23879-4.
- Echte, Bernhard; Meier, Andreas (1990). Die Brüder Karl und Robert Walser (in German). Stäfa: Rothenhausler. ISBN 3-907960-37-8.
- Hesse, Hermann (1988). Knulp (in German). Frankfurt am Main: Suhrkamp. ISBN 3-518-38071-0.
- Poppe, Reiner: Königs Erläuterungen und Materialien, Band 17: Peter Camenzind, Unterm Rad, Knulp - Hermann Hesse Bange, Hollfeld 1996, ISBN 3-8044-1621-7.
- Schwilk, Heimo (2012). Hermann Hesse (in German). München: Piper. ISBN 978-3-492-05302-0.
- Unseld, Siegfried (1987). Hermann Hesse (in German). ISBN 3-458-32812-2. (1923 in Neue Freie Presse, quoted from Unseld)
- Ziolkowski, Theodore (1979). Der Schriftsteller Hermann Hesse (in German). Frankfurt am Main: Suhrkamp. ISBN 3-518-04748-5.
