= Ralph Manheim =

American literary translator

- Born: Ralph Frederick Manheim; April 4, 1907; New York City, New York, US
- Died: September 26, 1992 (aged 85); Cambridge, England
- Education: Harvard University, Yale University, Columbia University
- Occupation: Translator

Ralph Frederick Manheim (April 4, 1907 – September 26, 1992) was an American translator of German and French literature, as well as occasional works from Dutch, Polish and Hungarian. He was one of the most acclaimed translators of the 20th century, and likened translation to acting, the role being "to impersonate his author".

== Early life ==
Manheim was born to a Jewish family in New York City. His father was a rabbi and his mother a homemaker. He lived for a year in Germany and Austria as an adolescent and graduated from Harvard at the age of 19, and spent time in Munich and Vienna (studying at the universities) before Adolf Hitler’s rise to power. He also undertook post-graduate study at Yale and Columbia Universities.

== Career ==
His career as a translator began with Hitler's Mein Kampf, commissioned by Houghton Mifflin and published in 1943. Manheim endeavored to give an exact English equivalent of Hitler's highly individual, often awkward style, including his grammatical errors.

Manheim translated the works of Bertolt Brecht (in collaboration with John Willett), Louis-Ferdinand Céline, Günter Grass, Peter Handke, philosopher Martin Heidegger, Hermann Hesse, Novalis, and many others. His translation of Henry Corbin's work Alone with the Alone: Creative Imagination in the Sufism of Ibn 'Arabi could be considered a major contribution towards the understanding of Ibn Arabi's and Sufi philosophy in the English-speaking world.

In 1961, he rendered transcripts of the trial in Jerusalem of Adolf Eichmann into English, and Grimm's Tales For Young and Old – The Complete Stories, published in 1977. Modern readers are familiar with his 1986 translation of E. T. A. Hoffmann's "The Nutcracker and the Mouse King". It was published with illustrations by Maurice Sendak, in conjunction with the release of the 1986 film Nutcracker: The Motion Picture. Lovers of children's books also admire his agile translation of Michael Ende's The Neverending Story.

== Later life ==
In the 1940s, Manheim lived on Long Island and was a neighbor of Jackson Pollock and Lee Krasner. Krasner has stated that all of the titles for the paintings in Pollock's groundbreaking first show at the Betty Parsons Gallery in 1948 were provided by Manheim.

He moved to Paris in 1950 and lived there until 1985, when he moved with his fourth wife to Cambridge, England. He died in 1992, at age 85, from complications associated with prostate cancer.

== Selected translations ==
- Efraim's Book by Alfred Andersch
- The Good Person of Szechwan by Bertolt Brecht
- Baal by Bertolt Brecht
- The Threepenny Opera by Bertolt Brecht and Kurt Weill
- The Guiltless by Hermann Broch
- Journey to the End of the Night by Louis-Ferdinand Céline
- Castle to Castle by Louis-Ferdinand Céline
- Death on the Installment Plan by Louis-Ferdinand Céline
- A Season in the Congo: A Play by Aimé Césaire (1968)
- Creative Imagination in the Sufism of Ibn 'Arabi by Henry Corbin
- The Neverending Story by Michael Ende
- The Freud/Jung Letters
- The Life Before Us by Romain Gary
- Cat and Mouse: A Novel by Günter Grass (1963)
- The Tin Drum by Günter Grass (1963)
- Dog Years by Günter Grass (1965)
- The Rat by Günter Grass (1987)
- Grimm's Tales for Young and Old - The Complete Stories
- A Sorrow Beyond Dreams by Peter Handke
- The Left-Handed Woman by Peter Handke
- Short Letter, Long Farewell by Peter Handke
- Slow Homecoming by Peter Handke
- Repetition by Peter Handke
- Knulp: Three Tales from the Life of Knulp by Hermann Hesse (1976)
- Crisis: Pages From a Diary by Hermann Hesse (1975)
- Reflections by Hermann Hesse
- The Nutcracker and the Mouse King by E. T. A. Hoffmann
- The Darkest Hour: Adventures and Escapes by Léo Lania (1941)
- Today We Are Brothers, The Biography of a Generation by Leo Lania (1942)
- The History of the Maghrib: an Interpretive Essay by Abdallah Laroui
- Temptation: A Novel by John Pen (1946)
- Selected Letters: Volume One 1880–1903 by Marcel Proust (1983)
- Listen, Little Man! by Wilhelm Reich
- From Lenin to Stalin by Victor Serge (1937)
- The Long Dusk by Victor Serge (1946)
- Napoleon's Invasion of Russia, 1812 by Eugene Tarle (1942)
- Mein Kampf by Adolf Hitler (1943)
- Der Fuehrer: Hitler's Rise to Power by Konrad Heiden (1944)
- How to Stop the Russians without War by Fritz Sternberg (1948)
- An Introduction to Metaphysics by Martin Heidegger (1959)
- Painting in the Twentieth Century by Werner Haftmann (1960)
- Books in the Great Philosophers series, edited by Hannah Arendt (1962)
- Last Times by Victor Serge (revised edition of Long Dusk, 1946)
- Temptation by Jànos Székely

== Awards and honors ==
Manheim received the PEN Translation Prize in 1964.

He received the 1970 National Book Award in the Translation category for the first U.S. edition of Céline's Castle to Castle.

He was awarded a 1983 MacArthur Fellowship in Literary Studies. He won the PEN/Ralph Manheim Medal for Translation, a major lifetime achievement award in the field of translation, in 1988.

Manheim's 1961 translation of Günter Grass's Die Blechtrommel (The Tin Drum) was elected to fourth place among outstanding translations of the previous half century by the Translators Association of the Society of Authors on the occasion of their 50th anniversary in 2008.

== See also ==
- Mein Kampf in English
