= My Century =

1999 novel by Günter Grass

First edition (publ. Steidl)

My Century (German: Mein Jahrhundert, 1999) is a novel written by German author Günter Grass. Having published many significant novels in the postwar period, he was awarded the 1999 Nobel Prize in Literature.

Each chapter in My Century is only a few pages long. Each focuses on a single year from 1900 to 1999. The story of each year is told differently, expressed by changes in time, place, narrator and literary style.

== Reception ==
While acknowledging Grass' talents and works, Peter Gay of The New York Times said of this book:

Grass's intentions are obvious: he was trying to construct a mosaic of German history across the 20th century through the diverse voices of its participants. Each year is designed to illuminate an event or create an atmosphere, the whole, without consecutive narration, commentary or analysis, to add up to a living portrait. Instead Grass has produced a collection of fragments that fail to cohere."

Similarly, Richard Bernstein of The New York Times said that the book is a kaleidoscope, "But it is a pale, watery sort of kaleidoscope, providing unsatisfactorily fragmentary glances at people and events that disappear almost as soon as they are seen."

Wolfgang Weber was more appreciative; he said:

"This is Grass's way of challenging the conventional view of history. Instead of an event being presented abstractly and in a familiar form, in connection with “great politics”, it is viewed as through a prism “from below” and “from close up” ... from changing, unexpected viewpoints. The stories about the first half of the century are also linguistically colourful and multifaceted, allowing history to be re-lived and re-considered."
