= Dog Years (novel) =

1965 novel by Günter Grass

- First German edition
- Author: Günter Grass
- Original title: Hundejahre
- Translator: Ralph Manheim
- Cover artist: Günter Grass
- Language: German
- Series: Danzig Trilogy
- Genre: Novel
- Publisher: Harcourt, Brace and World
- Publication date: 1965
- Publication place: Germany
- Media type: Print (Hardback & Paperback)
- Pages: 570 pp
- Preceded by: Cat and Mouse
- Followed by: Crabwalk

Dog Years (German: Hundejahre) is a novel by Günter Grass. It was first published in Germany in 1963. Its English translation, by Ralph Manheim, was first published in 1965. It is the third and last volume of his Danzig Trilogy, the other two being The Tin Drum and Cat and Mouse. The novel consists of three different chronological parts, from the 1920s to the 1950s. The main characters are Walter Matern and Eduard Amsel.

== Plot ==
Walter Matern and Eduard Amsel are friends. Eduard is half Jewish and at the young age of five is a genius at making scarecrows. The narrator in Book One, the mine owner Brauxel, tells of the friendship of Walter and Eduard when they are children in the Vistula estuary, which is a German-Polish borderland (the interwar Free City of Danzig) peopled by Mennonites, Catholics and Protestants. Eduard keeps a diary which he fills with drawings of ideas for scarecrows. The history of this country is told with cruel images of horror and violence from that past that echoes into the present, which becomes Hitler's Germany.

The story in the second part of the book is narrated by Harry Liebenau, and consists of letters from him addressed to his cousin Tulla. This part of the story occurs during the war period, when Amsel collects vast numbers of S.A. uniforms, and dresses his scarecrows in them. He also persuades his childhood friend Walter to become a member of the S.A., in order to help him obtain the uniforms. But since the confusion in this country has reached its maximum at this point in time, it is inevitable that the two friends end up on a collision course. At one point Walter denounces Amsel as a Jew, hits him in the face and knocks out all of his teeth.

The last part of the novel is narrated by Walter and takes place after he has found his new friend Prinz. They leave on a journey in the postwar West Germany, where they systematically attack former Nazis who are now posing as respectable officials throughout the country.

== Discussion ==
Grass's style frequently parodies Martin Heidegger's arcane philosophical syntax in Being and Time, which one of the teenage protagonists likes to poke fun at. The years from the prewar to the postwar era are presented in Dog Years through the perspective of three different narrators, a team directed by Amsel — alias Brauxel — who makes scarecrows in man's image. The seemingly solid childhood friendship of Amsel and Matern evolves into the love-hate relationship between Jew and non-Jew under the impact of Nazi ideology. When the former friends from the region of the Vistula Delta finally meet again in the West, the ominous Alsatian dog (German Shepherd) that followed Matern on his odyssey is left behind in Brauxel's subterranean world of scarecrows. While Dog Years, like The Tin Drum, again accounts for the past through the eyes of an artist, the artist is no longer a demonic tin-drummer in the guise of a child but the ingenious maker of a world of objects reflecting the break between the creations of nature and those of men. The narrator refers to Amsel's "keen sense of reality in all its innumerable forms."
