= Hitler Youth generation =

Germans who experienced childhood, adolescence, and early adulthood in Nazi Germany

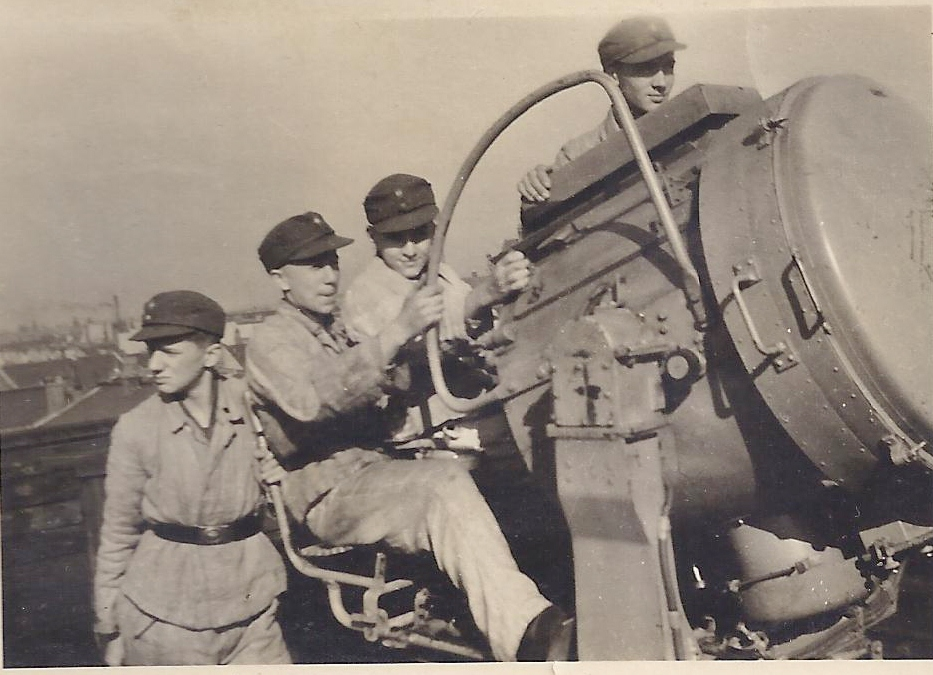
Flakhelfers pictured manning a searchlight in Berlin in 1943. Recruited among adolescents too young for military service, the Flakhelfers are sometimes considered emblematic of the generation who grew up under the Nazi regime.

In German history, the Hitler Youth generation refers to the generation of Germans born approximately between 1922 and 1930 and who experienced childhood, adolescence, and early adulthood in Nazi Germany (1933–1945). It is one of several terms used in social historians and sociologists similar to the Flakhelfer generation or Forty-fivers which may differ slightly in scope. It is conventionally argued that the immersion of this group within Nazi social and ideological structures, such as the Hitler Youth or League of German Girls, made this group the most "fanatical" adherents of Nazi ideology. According to the historian Gabriele Rosenthal:

The members of the Hitler-youth generation (born approximately between 1922 and 1930), experienced their childhood and youth in the 'Third Reich'. In school and youth movements they were socialized in the ideology of National Socialism. As children and youths these were, according to Nazi propaganda, the 'guarantors of the future', and they were raised to establish a new society. Their self-confidence was developed and strengthened by the establishment of youth movements which had not been available to previous generations. ... National Socialist pedagogues were also successful in arousing enthusiasm in these young people for the Nazi Weltanschauung and the war. Many of these youngsters were glad to be able to join the auxiliary forces towards the end of the war. The older members of the generation were conscripted into the Flak-auxiliary, and then at the very end into the regular army.

The size of this generation is estimated at approximately nine million and the following cohort is sometimes described as the War generation. In contrast with older age groups, it is also argued that the Hitler Youth generation emerged from the Second World War with little experience of combat and mortality than older age groups and were accordingly a preponderant demography during the early post-war years in West Germany and East Germany as late as the 1960s.
