= The Call of the Toad (novel) =

1992 novel

- First edition (German)
- Author: Günter Grass
- Original title: Unkenrufe
- Language: German
- Genre: Novel
- Publisher: Steidl
- Publication date: 1992
- Publication place: Germany
- English publication date: 1992
- Media type: Print
- ISBN: 978-3-88243-222-0

The Call of the Toad, published in Germany in 1992 as Unkenrufe (lit. 'Doomsday Predictions'), is a novel by Danzig-born German author Günter Grass. It describes the love story between the German widower Alexander Reschke and Polish widow Alexandra Piatkowska. It was adapted into a 2005 film directed by Robert Gliński.
