= Peeling the Onion =

2006 autobiographical work by Günter Grass

- First edition cover
- Author: Günter Grass
- Original title: Beim Häuten der Zwiebel
- Translator: Michael Henry Heim
- Publisher: Steidl
- Publication date: 2006
- English publication date: 2007
- ISBN: 978-3-865-21330-3

Peeling the Onion (German: Beim Häuten der Zwiebel) is a 2006 autobiographical work by German Nobel Prize–winning author and playwright Günter Grass. It begins with the end of his childhood in Danzig (Gdansk) when the Second World War breaks out, and ends with the author finishing his first great literary success, The Tin Drum.
