= Danzig Trilogy =

Three novels by Günter Grass (published 1959–1963)

The Danzig Trilogy (German: Danziger Trilogie) is a series of novels and novellas by German author Günter Grass. The trilogy focuses on the interwar and wartime period in the Free City of Danzig (now Gdańsk, Poland).

The three books in the trilogy are:

- The Tin Drum (Die Blechtrommel), published in 1959
- Cat and Mouse (Katz und Maus), published in 1961
- Dog Years (Hundejahre), published in 1963

John Reddick was the first person to explicitly identify the three books as a trilogy and to refer to it as the Danzig Trilogy. German publisher Luchterhand re-issued the three novels under the overall heading Danziger Trilogie in 1980. In 1987, Harcourt Brace Jovanovich published the first US edition of the entire trilogy under this name.

The trilogy is sometimes seen as part of a larger pentology that includes the later works Der Butt (1977) and Die Rättin (1986). An alternative interpretation extends the trilogy to a sextet by the addition of Der Butt, Unkenrufe (1992), and Im Krebsgang (2002). Publisher Steidl advertised these six books as Das Danzig-Sextett in 2006.
