= Günter Grass =

German author and artist (1927–2015)

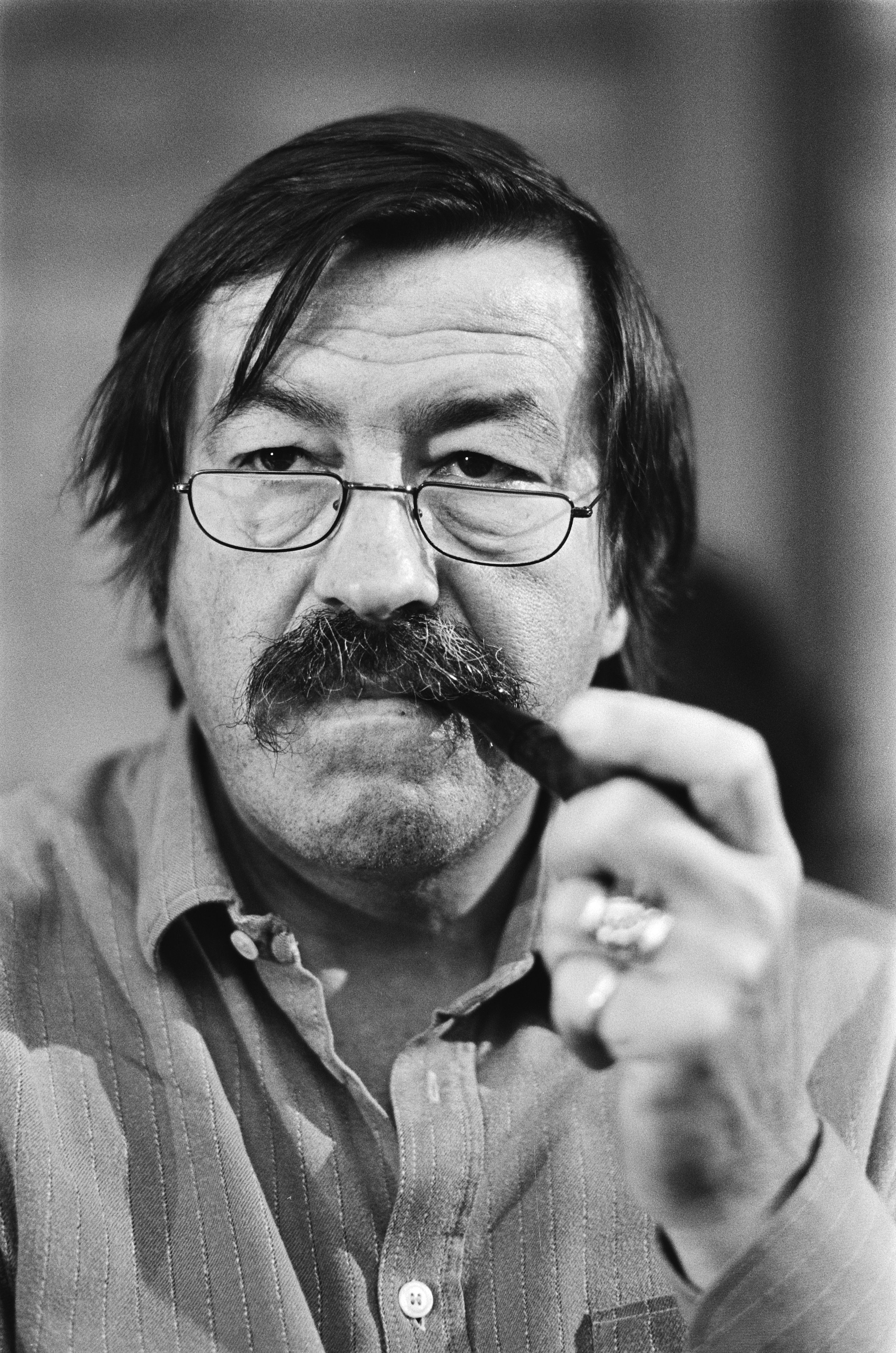
- Grass in 1982
- Born: Günter Wilhelm Grass; 16 October 1927; Danzig-Langfuhr, Free City of Danzig
- Died: 13 April 2015 (aged 87); Lübeck, Germany
- Occupations: Novelist; poet; playwright; sculptor; graphic designer
- Spouses: Anna Margareta Schwarz (m. 1954; div. 1978) Ute Grunert (m. 1979)
- Children: 6
- Writing career
- Language: German
- Period: 1956–2013
- Notable works: The Tin Drum (1959); Cat and Mouse (1961); Dog Years (1963); Crabwalk (2002)
- Notable awards: Georg Büchner Prize 1965; Honorary Fellow of the Royal Society of Literature 1993; Nobel Prize in Literature 1999; Prince of Asturias Award for Literature 1999
- Movement: Vergangenheitsbewältigung

Günter Wilhelm Grass (German: [ˈɡʏntɐ ˈɡʁas]; 16 October 1927 – 13 April 2015) was a German novelist, poet, playwright, illustrator, graphic artist, sculptor, and recipient of the 1999 Nobel Prize in Literature.

He was born in the Free City of Danzig (now Gdańsk, Poland). At age 17, he was drafted into the military and served from late 1944 in the Waffen-SS. He was taken as a prisoner of war by US forces at the end of the war in May 1945. He was released in April 1946. Trained as a stonemason and sculptor, Grass began writing in the 1950s. In his fiction, he frequently returned to the Danzig of his childhood.

Grass is best known for his first novel, The Tin Drum (1959), a key text in European magic realism. It was the first book of his Danzig Trilogy, the other two being Cat and Mouse and Dog Years. His works are frequently considered to have a left-wing political dimension, and Grass was an active supporter of the Social Democratic Party of Germany (SPD).

The Tin Drum was adapted as a film of the same name, which won both the 1979 Palme d'Or and the Academy Award for Best Foreign Language Film. In 1999, the Swedish Academy awarded Grass the Nobel Prize in Literature, praising him as a writer "whose frolicsome black fables portray the forgotten face of history".

== Early life ==
Grass was born in the Free City of Danzig on 16 October 1927, to Wilhelm Grass (1899–1979), a Lutheran Protestant of German origin, and Helene Grass (née Knoff, 1898–1954), a Roman Catholic of Kashubian-Polish origin. He identified as Kashubian. Grass was raised a Catholic and served as an altar boy when he was a child. His parents had a grocery store with an attached apartment in Danzig-Langfuhr (now Gdańsk-Wrzeszcz). He had a younger sister, Waltraud, born in 1930.

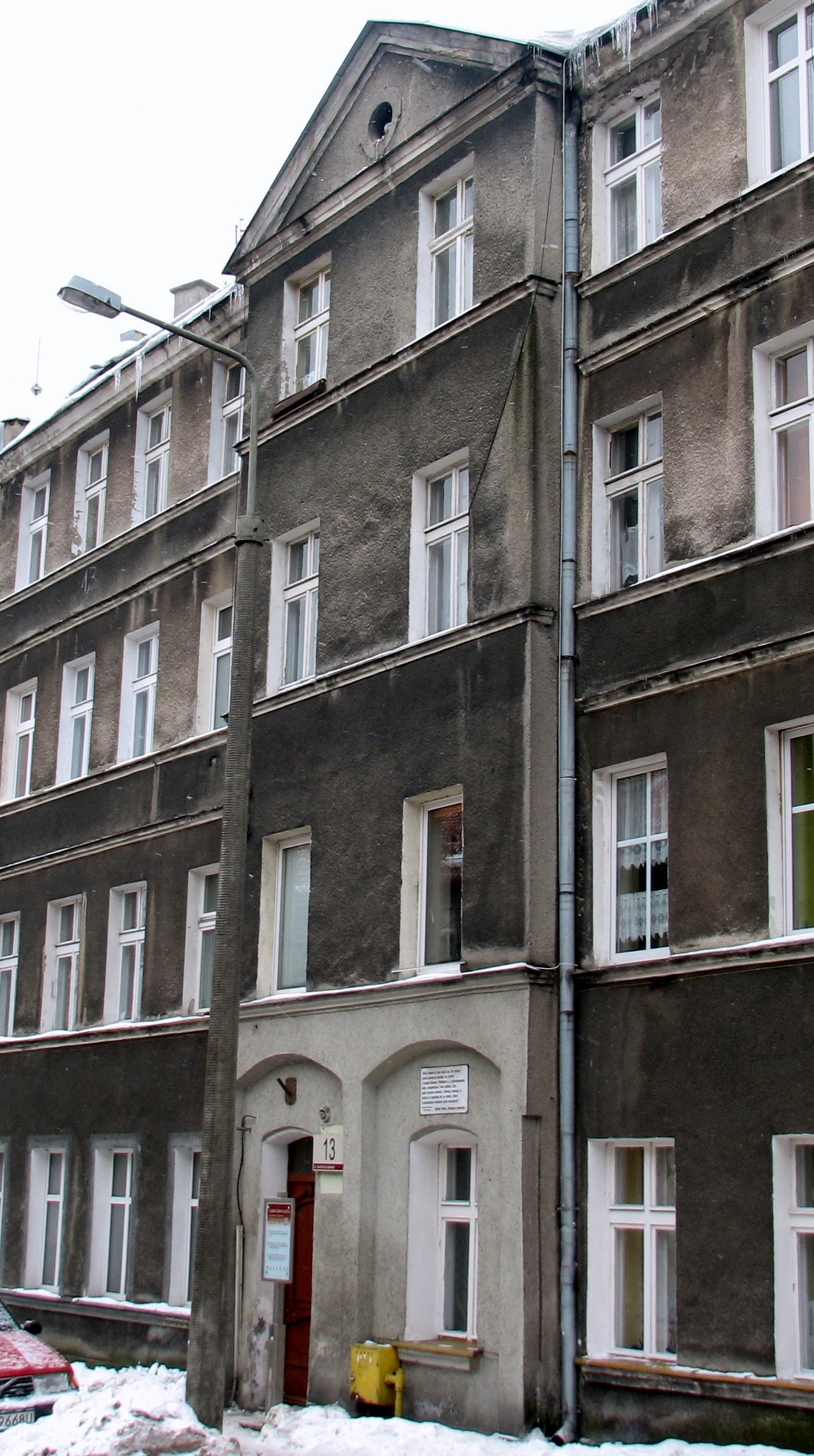
Grass's childhood home in Danzig (now Gdańsk, Poland) in 2010

Grass attended the Danzig gymnasium Conradinum. In 1943, at age 16, he became a Luftwaffenhelfer (Air Force "helper"). Soon thereafter, he was conscripted into the Reichsarbeitsdienst (Reich Labour Service). In November 1944, shortly after his 17th birthday, Grass volunteered for submarine service with Nazi Germany's Kriegsmarine, "to get out of the confinement felt as a teenager in his parents' house", which he considered stuffy Catholic lower middle-class.

After the Navy refused him, he was called up for the 10th SS Panzer Division Frundsberg in late 1944. Grass did not reveal until 2006 that he was drafted into the Waffen-SS at that time. His unit functioned as a regular Panzer Division, and he served with them from February 1945 until he was wounded on 20 April 1945. He was captured in Marienbad (now Mariánské Lázně, Czech Republic) and sent to a US prisoner-of-war camp in Bad Aibling, Bavaria.

From 1946 to 1947, Grass worked in a mine and received training in stonemasonry. He studied sculpture and graphics at the Kunstakademie Düsseldorf. He also was a cofounder of Group 47, organized by Hans Werner Richter. Grass worked as a writer, graphic designer, and sculptor, traveling frequently.

In 1953 he moved to West Berlin and studied at the Berlin University of the Arts. From 1960, he lived in Berlin as well as part-time in Schleswig-Holstein. In 1961 he publicly objected to the erection of the Berlin Wall.

From 1983 to 1986, he held the presidency of the Academy of Arts, Berlin.

== Major works ==
=== Danzig Trilogy ===
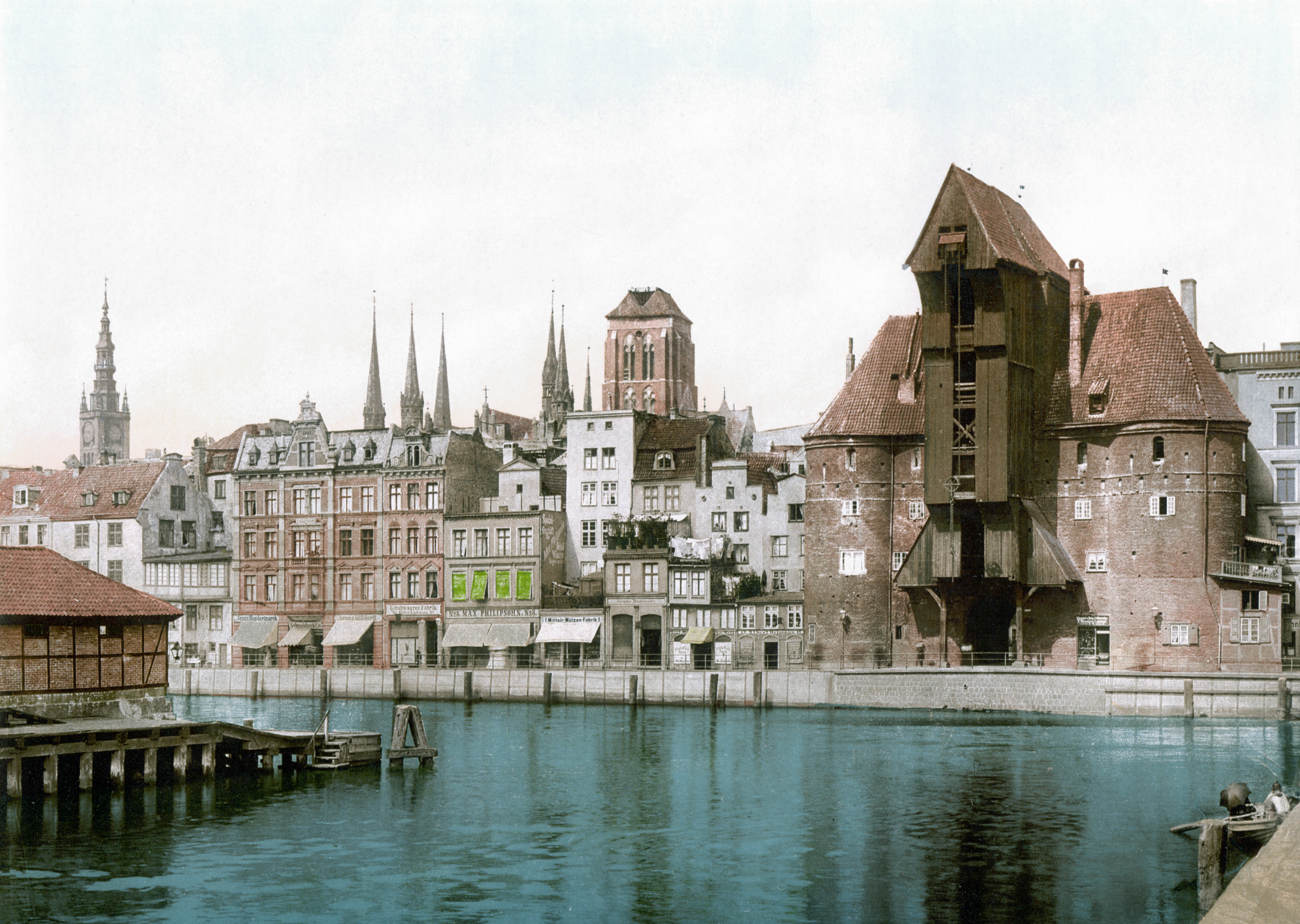
Danzig Krantor waterfront (postcard, c. 1900)

Grass's best-known work is The Tin Drum (Die Blechtrommel), published in 1959 (and adapted as a film of the same name by director Volker Schlöndorff in 1979). It was followed in 1961 by Cat and Mouse (Katz und Maus), a novella, and in 1963 by the novel Dog Years (Hundejahre).

The books are collectively called the Danzig Trilogy and focus on the rise of Nazism and how World War II affected Danzig (now Gdańsk, Poland). It had been separated from Germany after World War I and was designated as the Free City of Danzig (Freie Stadt Danzig).

Dog Years (1965) is considered a sequel of sorts to The Tin Drum, as it features some of the same characters. It portrays the area's mixed ethnicities and complex historical background in lyrical prose that is highly evocative.

The Tin Drum established Grass as one of the leading authors of Germany. It set a high bar of comparison for all of his subsequent works, which critics often compared unfavorably to this early work. In West Germany of the late 1950s and early '60s, the book was controversial. The city of Bremen revoked a prize it bestowed on Grass because of what its leaders considered the "immorality" of his debut novel. When Grass received the Nobel Prize in literature in 1999, the Nobel Committee stated that the publication of The Tin Drum "was as if German literature had been granted a new beginning after decades of linguistic and moral destruction".

=== The Flounder ===
The 1977 novel The Flounder (Der Butt) is based on the folktale of "The Fisherman and His Wife", and deals with the struggle between the sexes. It has been read as an anti-feminist novel. In the novel the magical flounder of the folk tale represents male triumphalism and the patriarchy. It is caught by a group of 1970s feminists, who put it on trial. The book interrogates male-female relations from the past and the present through the relationship between the narrator and his wife who, like the wife in the folk tale, insatiably craves more. Although the book could be read as a defense of women and a denunciation of male chauvinism, it was largely harshly critiqued and rejected by feminists. They rejected its portrayal of violence, sexualization and objectification, and what they perceived as male narcissism and gender essentialism.

=== My Century and Crabwalk ===
In My Century (Mein Jahrhundert, 1999) Grass covered many of the 20th-century's brutal historic events, conveyed in short pieces of a few pages by year, forming a mosaic of expression.

In 2002, Grass returned to the forefront of world literature with Crabwalk (Im Krebsgang). This novella, one of whose main characters first appeared in Cat and Mouse, was Grass's most successful work in decades. It dealt with the events of a refugee ship, full of thousands of Germans, being sunk by a Soviet Russian submarine, killing most on board. It was one of a number of works since the late 20th century that have explored the victimization of Germans in World War II.

=== Memoir trilogy ===
In 2006, Grass published the first volume in a trilogy of autobiographic memoirs. Titled Peeling the Onion (Beim Häuten der Zwiebel), it dealt with his childhood, war years, early efforts as a sculptor and poet, and finally his literary success with the publication of The Tin Drum. In a pre-publication interview, Grass revealed for the first time that he had been a member of the Waffen-SS, and not only served as a Flakhelfer (anti-aircraft assistant), as he had long claimed. On being asked about his decision to make a public confession, he answered: "It was a weight on me, my silence over all these years is one of the reasons I wrote the book. It had to come out in the end."

In response to the interview and the book, many critics accused him of hypocrisy for having hidden this part of his past, while simultaneously being a strong voice for ethics and morality in the public debate. The book was praised for its depictions of the German postwar generation, and the social and moral development of a nation burdened simultaneously by destruction and a deep sense of guilt. Throughout the memoir, Grass plays with the frailty of memory, for which the layers of the onion are a metaphor. Grass second-guesses his own memories, throws his own autobiographical statements into doubt, and questions whether the person inhabiting his past was really him. This struggle with memory comes to represent the struggle of the German people during the same period with Germany's Nazi past.

He published the second volume of the trilogy, The Box (German: Die Box) in 2008; and the third, Grimms Wörter (Grimm's Words), the title referring to the Brothers Grimm's Deutsches Wörterbuch (German Dictionary), in 2010.

== Main themes and literary style ==
Grass's work is centered on World War II and its effects on Germany and the German people. He critiques the forms of ideological reasoning that undergirded the Nazi regime. He uses the location of the city of Danzig/Gdańsk and its ambiguous historical status between Germany and Poland to stand as a symbol of the ambiguity between and among ethnic groups. Grass's ancestry includes both German and Slavic family members, some of whom fought on opposite sides of the war. His works also show a sustained concern for the marginal and marginalized subjects, such as Oskar Matzerath, the dwarf in The Tin Drum, whose body was considered an aberration unworthy of life in the Nazi ideology, or the Roma and Sinti people deemed impure and unworthy by the Nazis and subjected to eugenics and genocide, as were the Jews.

Grass's literary style combines elements of magic realism with a penchant for questioning. He complicates questions of authorship by intermingling realistic autobiographical elements with unreliable narrators and fantastic events or happenings that create irony or satirize events to form social critiques.

== Reception by critics and colleagues ==
Grass's work has tended to divide the critics into those who have considered his experiments and style to be sublime and those who have found it to be tied down by his political posturing. American critics, such as John Updike, have found the mixture of politics and social critique in his works to diminish its artistic qualities. In his various critiques of Grass's works, Updike wrote that Grass had been consumed by his "strenuous career as celebrity-author-artist-Socialist" and said about one of his later novels that "he can't be bothered to write a novel; he just sends dispatches ... from the front lines of his engagement". Even if frequently critical of Grass, Updike considered him to be "one of the very, very few authors whose next novel one has no intention of missing".

Grass's literary style has been widely influential. John Irving called Grass "simply the most original and versatile writer alive". According to Mews, critics have noted parallels between Irving's A Prayer for Owen Meany (1989) and The Tin Drum. Similarly, Salman Rushdie has acknowledged a debt to Grass's work, particularly The Tin Drum; in addition, Mews has said parallels to Grass's work have been pointed out in Rushdie's own oeuvre.

== Social and political activism ==
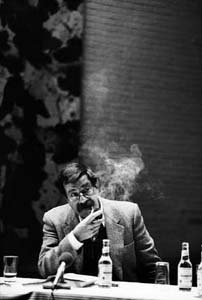
Grass in 1986

Grass was for several decades a supporter of the Social Democratic Party of Germany and its policies. He took part in German and international political debate on several occasions. During Willy Brandt's chancellorship, Grass was an active supporter. Grass criticized left-wing radicals and instead argued in favor of the "snail's pace", as he put it, of democratic reform (Aus dem Tagebuch einer Schnecke, literally "from the diary of a snail"). Books containing his speeches and essays have been published throughout his literary career.

In the 1980s, Grass became active in the peace movement and visited Calcutta for six months. A diary with drawings was published as Zunge zeigen, an allusion to Kali's tongue.

During the events leading up to the reunification of Germany in 1989–90, Grass argued for the continued separation of the two German states. He asserted that a unified Germany would be likely to resume its role as belligerent nation-state. This argument estranged many Germans, who came to see him as too much of a moralizing figure.

In 2001, Grass proposed the creation of a German-Polish museum for art lost to other countries during the War. The Hague Convention of 1907 requires the return of art that had been evacuated, stolen or seized. Some countries refused to repatriate some of the looted art.

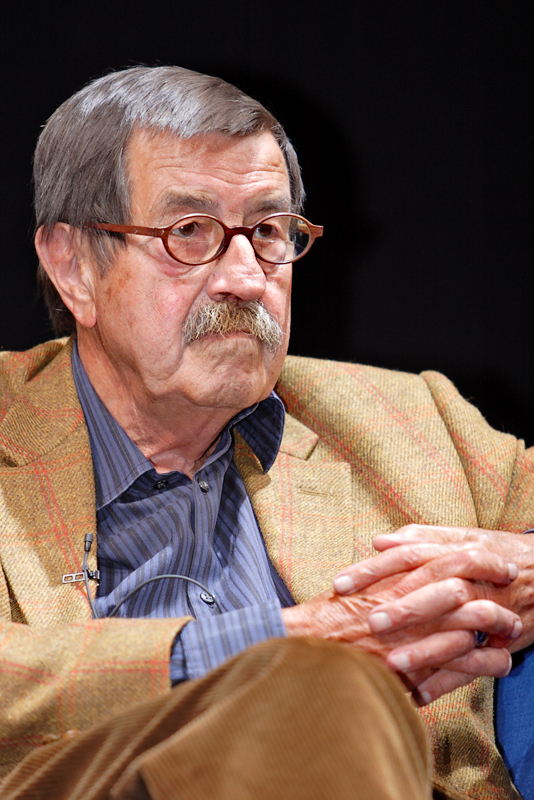
Grass in 2006

On 4 April 2012, Grass's poem "What Must Be Said" (Was gesagt werden muss) was published in several European newspapers. Grass expressed his concern about the hypocrisy of German military support (the delivery of a submarine) of Israel, which might use such equipment to launch nuclear warheads against Iran, which "could wipe out the Iranian people". He hoped that many would demand "that the governments of both Iran and Israel allow an international authority free and open inspection of the nuclear potential and capability of both." In response, Israel declared him persona non grata in that country.

According to Avi Primor, president of the Israel Council on Foreign Relations, Grass was the only important German cultural figure who had refused to meet with him when he served as Israeli ambassador to Germany. Primor noted: "One explanation for [Grass']s strange behavior might be found in the fact that Grass (who despite his poem is probably not the bitter enemy of Israel that one would imagine) had certain personal difficulties with Israel that were not necessarily of his own making." Primor said that during Grass's earlier visit to Israel, he

"was confronted with the anger of an Israeli public that booed him in successive public appearances. To be sure, the Israeli protestors were not targeting Grass personally and their anger had nothing at all to do with his literature. It was the German effort to establish cultural relations with Israel to which they objected. Grass, however, did not see it that way and may well have felt personally slighted."

Grass supported the Campaign for the Establishment of a United Nations Parliamentary Assembly, an organization that campaigns for democratic reform of the United Nations, and the creation of a more accountable international political system.

On 26 April 2012, Grass wrote a poem criticizing European policy in the treatment of Greece in the European debt crisis. In "Europe's Disgrace", Grass accuses Europe of condemning Greece to poverty, a country "whose mind conceived Europe".

Just a few days before he died, Grass completed his last book, Vonne Endlichkait. The title is in East Prussian dialect, the native dialect of Grass, and means "About Finitude". According to his publisher Gerhard Steidl, the book was "a literary experiment", combining short prose texts, poems, and pencil drawings by the writer. The book was published in August 2015.

== Awards and honours ==
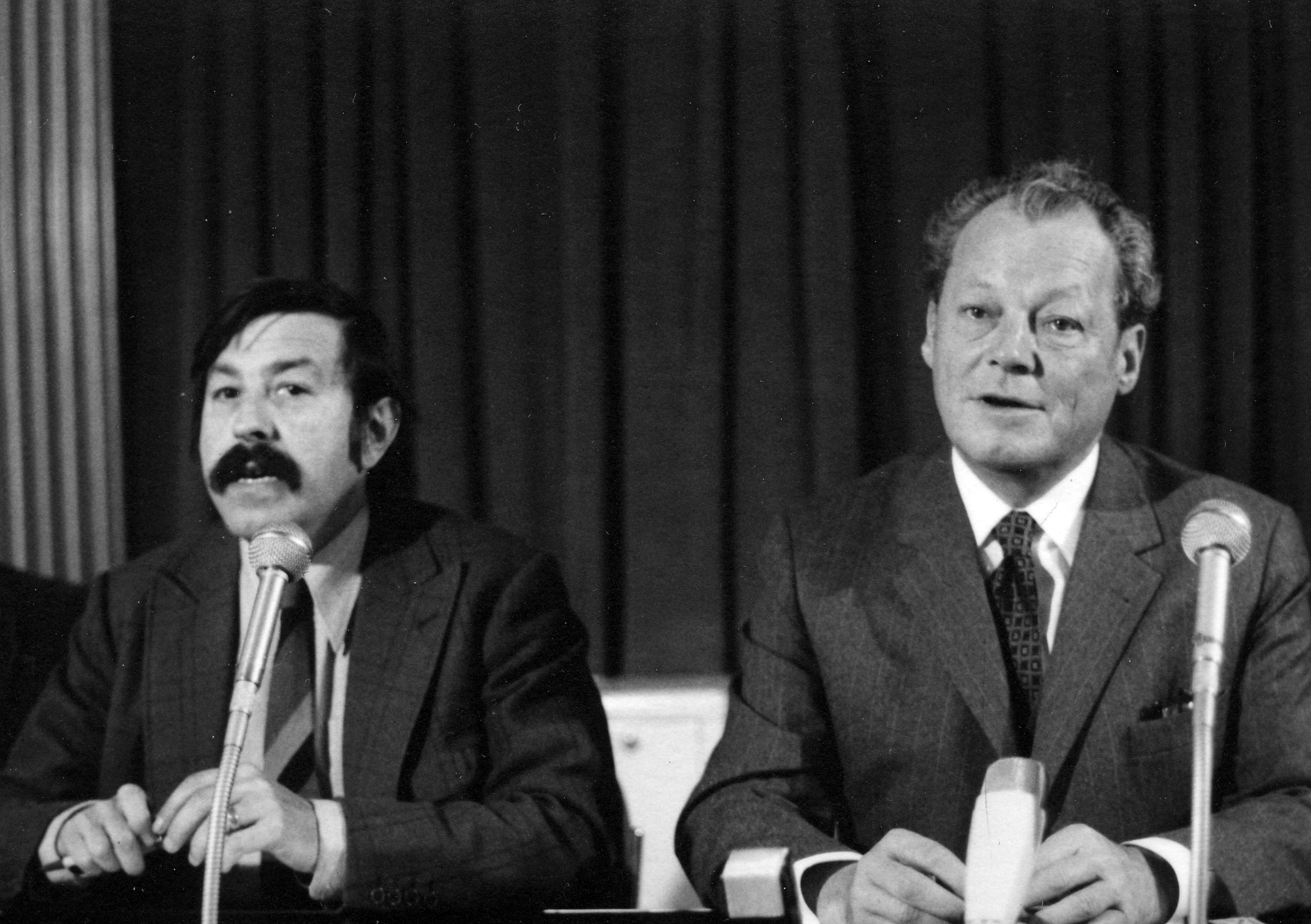
Grass with the West German Chancellor Willy Brandt, 1972

Grass received dozens of international awards; in 1999, he was awarded the highest literary honour: the Nobel Prize in Literature. The Swedish Academy noted him as a writer "whose frolicsome black fables portray the forgotten face of history". His literature is commonly categorized as part of the German artistic movement known as Vergangenheitsbewältigung, roughly translated as "coming to terms with the past."

In 1965, Grass received the Georg Büchner Prize; in 1993 he was elected an Honorary Fellow of the Royal Society of Literature In 1995, he received the Hermann Kesten Prize.

Representatives of the city of Bremen joined to establish the Günter Grass Foundation with the aim of establishing a centralized collection of his numerous works, especially his many personal readings, videos and films. The Günter Grass House in Lübeck houses exhibitions of his drawings and sculptures, and an archive and a library.

In 1992, he received the Hidalgo Prize, awarded by the National Association of Spain "Presencia Gitana", in recognition of his defense of the Romani People.

In 2012, Grass received the European of the Year award from the European Movement Denmark (Europabevægelsen), honoring his political debates in European affairs.

== Waffen-SS revelations ==
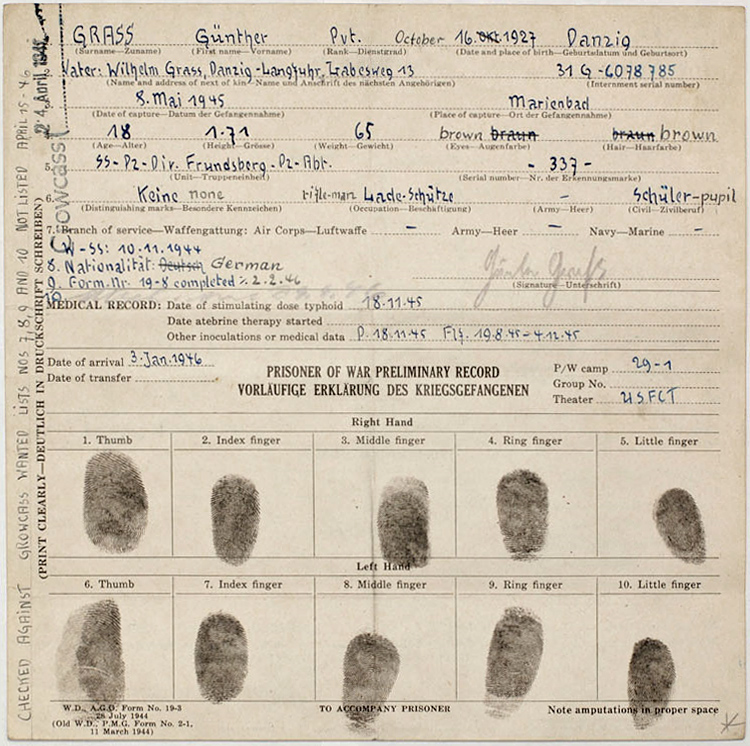
Grass's prisoner of war record, indicating Waffen-SS membership

In August 2006, in an interview to the Frankfurter Allgemeine Zeitung about his forthcoming book, Peeling the Onion, Grass said that he had been a member of the Waffen-SS in World War II. Before that, he was thought to have been a typical member of the "Flakhelfer generation", one of those too young to see much fighting or to be involved with the Nazi regime beyond its youth organizations. On 15 August 2006, Spiegel Online published three 1946 documents from US forces verifying Grass's Waffen-SS membership.

After an unsuccessful attempt to volunteer for the U-boat fleet in 1942, at age 15, Grass had been conscripted into the Reichsarbeitsdienst (Reich Labor Service). He was called up for the Waffen-SS in 1944. Grass was trained as a tank gunner and fought with the 10th SS Panzer Division Frundsberg until its surrender to US forces at Marienbad.

In 2007, Grass published an account of his wartime experience in The New Yorker, including an attempt to "string together the circumstances that probably triggered and nourished [his] decision to enlist." To the BBC, Grass said in 2006: "It happened as it did to many of my age. We were in the labour service and all at once, a year later, the call-up notice lay on the table. And only when I got to Dresden did I learn it was the Waffen-SS."

As Grass was for many decades an outspoken left-leaning critic of Germany's failure to deal with its Nazi past, his statement caused a great stir in the press. Rolf Hochhuth said it was "disgusting" that this same "politically correct" Grass had publicly criticized Helmut Kohl and Ronald Reagan's visit to a military cemetery at Bitburg in 1985, because it contained graves of Waffen-SS soldiers. In the same vein, historian Michael Wolffsohn accused Grass of hypocrisy in not earlier disclosing his SS membership. Joachim Fest, a biographer of Adolf Hitler, remarked on Grass's disclosure:

"After 60 years, this confession comes a bit too late. I can't understand how someone who for decades set himself up as a moral authority, a rather smug one, could pull this off."

Others defended Grass, saying his involuntary Waffen-SS service came very early in his life, resulting from his being drafted shortly after his seventeenth birthday. They noted he had always—after the war was lost—been publicly critical of Germany's Nazi past. For example, novelist John Irving criticized those who would dismiss the achievements of a lifetime because of a mistake made as a teenager.

Grass's biographer Michael Jürgs described the controversy as resulting in "the end of a moral institution". Lech Wałęsa initially criticized Grass for keeping silent about his Waffen-SS membership for 60 years. He later withdrew his criticism after reading Grass's letter to the mayor of Gdańsk, saying that Grass "set the good example for the others." On 14 August 2006, the ruling party of Poland, Law and Justice, called on Grass to relinquish his honorary citizenship of Gdańsk. Jacek Kurski, a Law and Justice politician, said, "It is unacceptable for a city where the first blood was shed, where World War II began, to have a Waffen-SS member as an honorary citizen." But, according to a 2010 poll ordered by city's authorities, the vast majority of Gdańsk citizens did not support Kurski's position. The mayor of Gdańsk, Paweł Adamowicz, said that he opposed submitting the affair to the municipal council because it was not for the council to judge history.

== Personal life ==
In 1954 Grass married Anna Margareta Schwarz, a Swiss dancer, which ended in divorce in 1978. He and Schwarz had four children: Franz (born 1957), Raoul (1957), Laura (1961), and Bruno (1965). They separated in 1972, and he began a relationship with Veronika Schröter, with whom he had a daughter, Helene (1974). He also had a daughter, Nele (1979), with Ingrid Kruger.

In 1979 he married Ute Grunert, an organist, to whom he was married up until his death. He had two stepsons from his second marriage, Malte and Hans. He had 18 grandchildren at his death.

Grass spent summers on a Danish island, spring and summer in southern Portugal, and was a fan of football club SC Freiburg.

== Death ==
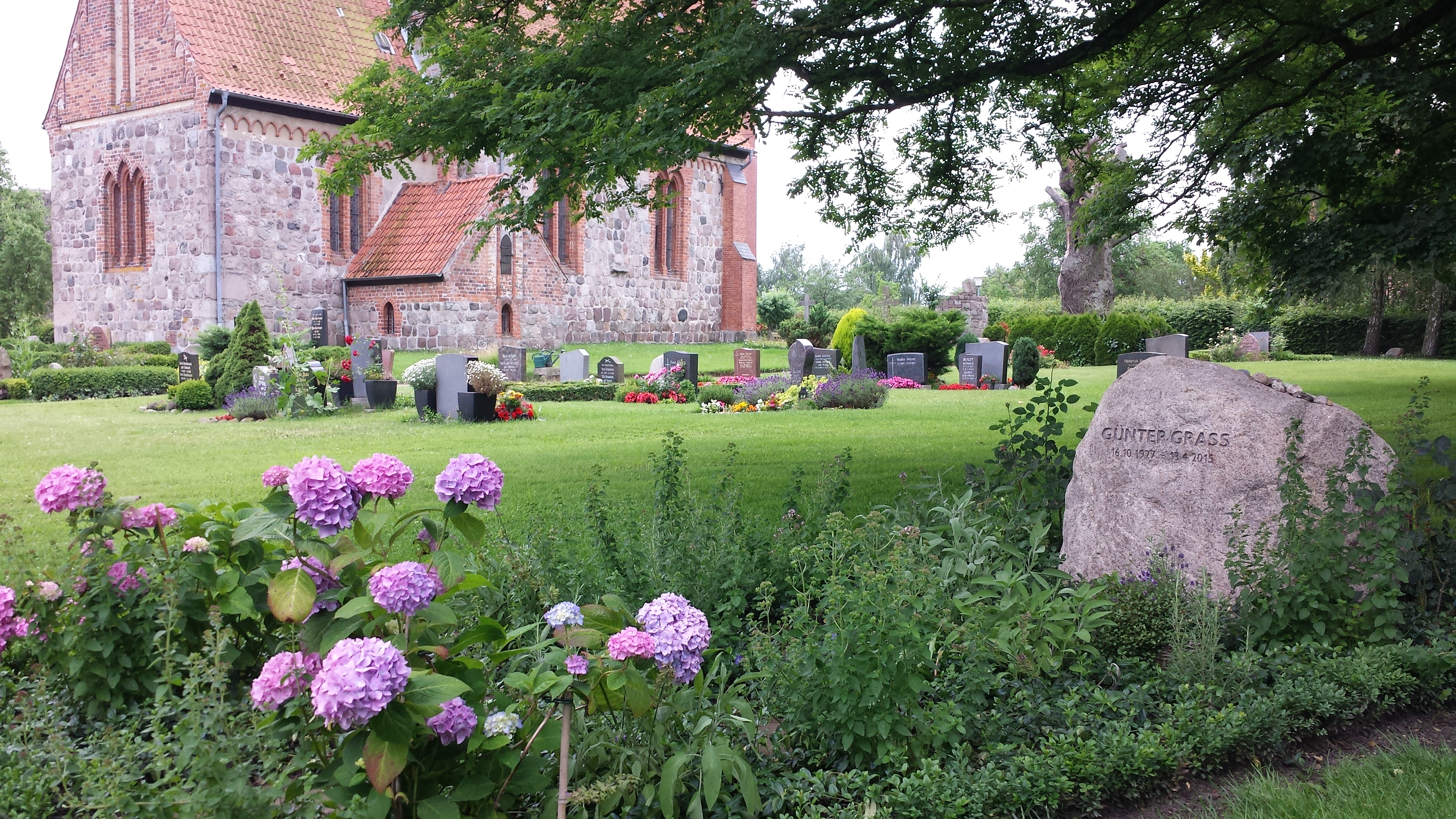
Grass's grave in Behlendorf

Grass died at the age of 87 of a lung infection on 13 April 2015 in a Lübeck hospital. He was buried in a private family observance on 29 April in Behlendorf, 15 miles south of Lübeck, where he had lived since 1995.

American novelist John Irving delivered the main eulogy at a memorial service for Grass on 10 May in the Theater Lübeck. Among those who attended were German President Joachim Gauck, former Chancellor Gerhard Schröder, federal Commissioner for Culture Monika Grütters, film director Volker Schlöndorff, and Paweł Adamowicz, mayor of Gdańsk. Grütters, in remarks to mourners, noted that, through his work, Grass championed the independence of artists and of art itself. Adamowicz said Grass had "bridged the chasm between Germany and Poland", and praised the novelist's "unwillingness to compromise".

== Reviews ==
- Murdoch, Brian (1982), Sisyphean Labours, which includes a review of Headbirths, or, The Germans are Dying Out, in Cencrastus No. 9, Summer 1982, p. 46, ISSN 0264-0856

== See also ==
- List of Nobel laureates in Literature

Awards and achievements
Preceded by Henrik, Prince Consort of Denmark	European of the Year (by the Danish European Movement); 2012	Succeeded by (Denmark) Emmelie de Forest
