= Rio Preisner =

American poet

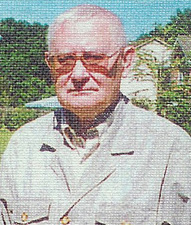
- Born: November 13, 1925; Mukačevo, Czechoslovakia
- Died: August 2, 2007 (aged 81); Indianola, Pennsylvania, U.S.
- Education: Charles University
- Occupations: Writer; poet; translator; professor
- Spouse: Olga Wittová
- Children: 1

Rio Preisner (November 13, 1925 – August 2, 2007) was a Czech poet, philosopher, translator, and scholar of Czech and German literature.

== Biography ==
Rio Preisner was born in the eastern town of Mukačevo (presently in Ukraine). In his childhood, he was exposed to a multicultural environment of Czech, Slovak, German, Ukrainian, Hungarian and Jewish communities. He spent his adolescence growing up in Prague under the shadow of the Nazi protectorate.

He graduated from high school (receiving his maturita) in 1944, when he was drafted to work in the Českomoravská-Kolben-Daněk factory in Prague, building Panzer tanks. At the end of the war, he studied in the German and English Departments of Charles University in Prague, obtaining his doctorate in 1950 with a dissertation on Franz Werfel. For the next year, he taught in the German Department of Charles University, and worked as a literary translator for the Mladá fronta and Státní nakladatelství krásné literatury publishing houses.

One month after his marriage to the art historian Olga Wittová in 1952, Preisner was arrested and sentenced to hard labour in a Stalinist labor camp. He had no idea as to the length of his sentence. "It was rumoured that I was to be sent to Siberia," he once said. "Only Stalin's death and the following thaw averted this fate." His imprisonment lasted from October 1, 1952, to November 28, 1954.

Upon his return to Prague, he taught German in the Státní jazyková škola (State Academy of Languages) until 1965. He also worked as a freelance translator and lent his hand in attempts at reforming the Československá strana lidová (Czechoslovak People's Party). In 1968, he won the Mladá fronta newspaper's literary prize for his Kafkaesque novel Kapiláry.

That same year, after the Warsaw Pact's squelching of the Prague Spring, he, his wife Olga, and their daughter Ruth left Prague for exile, first in Vienna, and later, from 1969, in the USA. The overwhelmingly positive response in Europe to the German edition of his critical work on Nestroy was the effective cause of his being offered a professorship at Pennsylvania State University.

From 1969 to his retirement in 1992, Preisner was Professor of German literature at Penn State in University Park, Pennsylvania. There, he taught both graduate and undergraduate students and directed many MA and PhD theses in German, Czech, and Comparative Literature. After his retirement, he and his wife moved to the Pittsburgh area, where he continued to write. His works, banned for some two decades, were again being published in the Czech Republic and received with critical acclaim.

Preisner belonged to the Svaz československých spisovatelů (Czechoslovak Writers' Union), the PEN-Club (Vienna), and the European Academy of Sciences and Arts. He was also named Fellow of the Institute for the Arts and Humanities at Penn State. In 2000, President Václav Havel awarded him the "Za zásluhy" medal ("For Meritorious Service") in the field of culture and scholarship.

Preisner died on August 2, 2007 in Indianola, Pennsylvania.

== Bibliography ==
=== Poetry ===
- 1968 – Kapiláry ("Capillaries"), Brno: Blok. I: Pan Schwitter platí účet v DVSP ("Mr Schwitter Pays His Dues"); II: Půdorys města ("City Plan")
- 1977 – Odstup ("Distance"), Montréal/Zurich.
- 1978 – Zvíře dětství ("The Animal of Childhood"), Munich: Poezie mimo Domov.
- 1980 – Zasuto ("Buried Layers Deep"), Munich: Jadrný Verlag.
- 1989 – Královská cesta ("The Royal Road"), London: Rozmluvy
- 1992 – Visuté mosty ("Hanging Bridges"), Prague: Rozmluvy
- 1992 – Praha za času plujících ker ("Prague in Thaw"), Prague: Pražská imaginace.
- 1994 – Vídeňské veduty ("Viennese veduti"), Prague: Proglas 8/94
- 1996 – Visuté mosty: Selected Poems, translated into English by C.S. Kraszewski, Rome/Svitavy: Accademia Cristiana/Trinitas.
- 1997 – Básně (Collected Poems), Prague: Torst

=== Prose: Criticism, philosophy, political science, history, cultural history ===
- 1968 – Jan Nepomuk Nestroy: Tvůrce tragické frašky ("Jan Nepomuk Nestroy: Creator of the Tragifarce"), Prague; German edition JNN: Der Schöpfer der tragischen Posse, published 1968 by Carl Hanser Verlag, Munich.
- 1973 – Kritika totalitarismu ("A Critique of Totalitarianism"), London: Rozmluvy.
- 1977 – Aspekte einer provokativen tschechischen Germanistik ("Aspects of Provocative Czech German Studies"), Vol 1: Kafka—Nestroy. Würzburg: Jal Verlag. Published as vol. 8 in the series "Colloquium Slavicum."
- 1981 – Kultura bez konce ("Culture Without End"), Munich.

— Aspekte einer provokativen tschechischen Germanistik (Aspects of Provocative Czech German Studies.) Vol 2: Avantgarde—Ideologie. Würzburg: Jal Verlag. Published as vol. 12 in the series "Colloquium Slavicum."

- 1984 – Česká existence ("Czech Existence"), London: Rozmluvy.
- 1987 – Až na konec Česka ("To the Very End of Czechia"), London: Rozmluvy.
- 1992 – Americana Brno: Atlantis. 2 vols.
- 1996 – Kultura bez konce ("Culture Without End"), re-issue with Václav Černý's O povaze naší kultury ("On the Character of our Culture"), Brno: Atlantis.
- 1999 – O životě a smrti konzervatismu ("On the Life and Death of Conservatism") Olomouc: Votobia, 1999
- 2003 – Když myslím na Evropu ("When I Think of Europe: Collected Essays"), Vol. I Prague: Torst
- 2004 – Když myslím na Evropu ("When I Think of Europe: Collected Essays"), Vol. II Prague: Torst

=== Translations of German and English authors ===
- Christian Geisler. Žádám odpověď (Anfrage—The Question)
- Johannes Bobrowski. Levinův mlýn (Levins Mühle—Levin's Mill)
- H. Broch. Smrt Vergilova (Tod des Vergil—The Death of Vergil) —Náměsíčníci (Die Schlafwandler—The Sleepwalkers)
- Hans Helmut Kirst. Nula osm patnáct (Null acht fünfzehn—0815)
- Stefan Zweig. Strach (Angst—Fear)
- Hans Jakob Christoffel von Grimmelshausen. Poběhlice Kuráž (Landstörzerin Courasche—The Life of Courage) —Divous Skočdopole (Der seltsame Springinsfeld—Tearaway)
- H. Hesse. Klingsorovo poslední léto a jiné prózy (Klingsors letzter Sommer, Morgenlandfahrt— Klingsors' Last Summer and other Prose Tales)
- Jean-Paul. Doktor Škrtikočka jede do lázní. Hrst aforismů (Doktor Katzenbergers Badereise, Aphorismen—* Doctor Katzenberger's Trip to the Spa, Aphorisms).
- Erich Auerbach. Mimesis (with V. Kafka and M. Žiliná)
- Friedrich Dürrenmatt. Soudce a jeho kat, Malér (Der Richter und sein Henker, Die Panne—The Judge and * His Hangman, The Breakdown)
- Franz Kafka. Aphorisms.

== Poets translated by Rio Preisner ==
- Karl Kraus
- Rainer Maria Rilke
- Friedrich Hölderlin
- Gottfried Benn
- T. S. Eliot
- Gerard Manley Hopkins
