= Simplicius Simplicissimus =

1668 novel by H. J. C. von Grimmelshausen

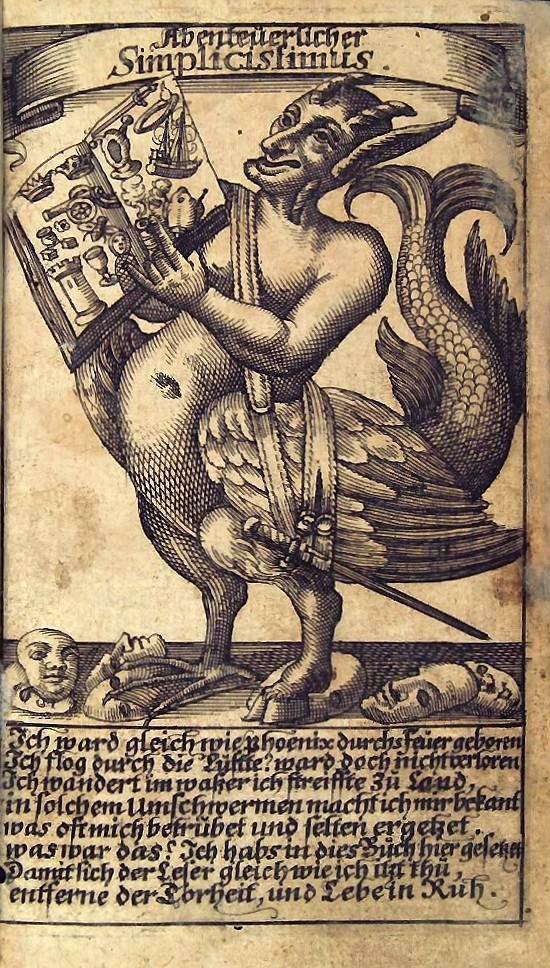
- Frontispiece of the first edition
- Author: Samuel Greifnsohn vom Hirschfelt or German Schleifheim von Sulsfort, (Note: Author, publisher and location all intentionally named non-existing entities, also the date given (1669) is considered false, as the first documented printing occurred in Nuremberg in 1668.) really H. J. C. von Grimmelshausen
- Original title: Der abentheuerliche Simplicissimus Teutsch
- Language: German
- Series: Simplician scriptures
- Genre: Picaresque novel
- Set in: 1618 to 1648 Thirty Years' War in Holy Roman Empire
- Publisher: Johann Fillion, really Wolff Eberhard Felßecker
- Publication date: 1668, really 1669
- Publication place: Holy Roman Empire

Simplicius Simplicissimus (German: Der abenteuerliche Simplicissimus Teutsch) is a picaresque novel of the lower Baroque style, written in five books by German author Hans Jakob Christoffel von Grimmelshausen published in 1668, with the sequel Continuatio appearing in 1669. Inspired by the events and horrors of the Thirty Years' War which devastated Germany from 1618 to 1648, it is regarded as the first adventure novel in the German language and the first German novel masterpiece.

The full subtitle is "The account of the life of an odd vagrant named Melchior Sternfels von Fuchshaim: namely where and in what manner he came into this world, what he saw, learned, experienced, and endured therein; also why he again left it of his own free will." Grimmelshausen wrote several sequels that together form the Simplician Cycle: The Life of Courage and Tearaway from 1670 and the two-volume The Wondrous Bird's Nest from 1672 and 1675.

== Structure ==
The work Simplicius Simplicissimus consists of five books nominally published in 1668, with a sequel Continuatio appearing in 1669. Each book is in turn divided into chapters. The Continuatio is considered the sixth book of the same cycle by scholars, though Grimmelshausen altogether produced ten titles which he claimed belong to the same set, the Simplician Cycle.

The English translation by Alfred Thomas Scrope Goodrick (1912) included the five books and selected chapters from the continuation. The full translation by Monte Adair (1986–2012) includes the continuation as Book Six.

== Authorship and publication ==
Simplicius Simplicissimus was published as the work of Samuel Greifnsohn vom Hirschfelt (Hirschfeld), with German Schleifheim von Sulsfort as its supposed author, but these have been deduced to be anagrammatical pseudonyms (Note: i.e., imperfect anagrams of "Christoffel von Grimmelshausen") of the real author, Hans Jakob Christoffel von Grimmelshausen, whose name is only disclosed in initials "H.I.C.V.G." in an advertisement (or rather Beschluss, "postscript" to the Continuatio) near the end of the published work.

The first edition pretends to have been printed at Mompelgart (Mömpelgart, present-day Montbéliard, France) by "Johann Fillion", but in fact they were printed in Nürnberg by Wolff Eberhard Felßecker, and though the colophon gave 1669 as the date, the publication had already appeared in 1668.

== Plot overview ==
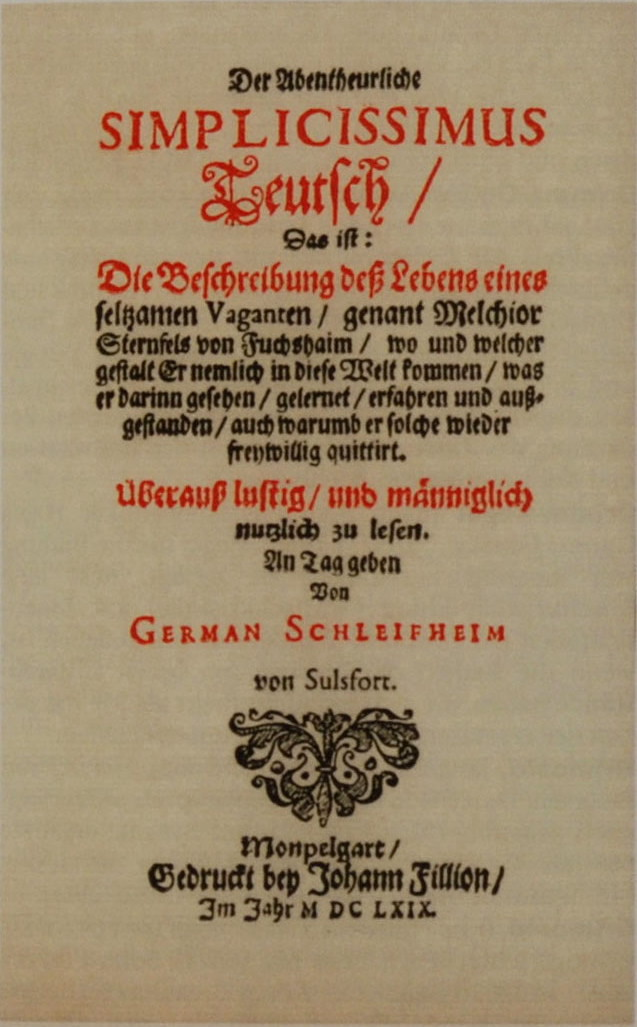
Title page of the first edition, 1669

The novel is told from the perspective of its protagonist Simplicius, a rogue or picaro typical of the picaresque novel, as he traverses the tumultuous world of the Holy Roman Empire during the Thirty Years' War. Raised by a peasant family, he is separated from his home by foraging dragoons and is adopted by a hermit living in the forest, who teaches him to read and introduces him to religion. The hermit also gives Simplicius his name because he was so simple that he did not know what his own name was. After the death of the hermit, Simplicius must fend for himself. He is conscripted at a young age into service, and from there embarks on years of foraging, military triumph, wealth, prostitution, disease, bourgeois domestic life, and travels to Russia, France, and to an alternate world inhabited by mermen. The novel ends with Simplicius turning to a life of hermitage himself, denouncing the world as corrupt.

== Frontispiece monster ==
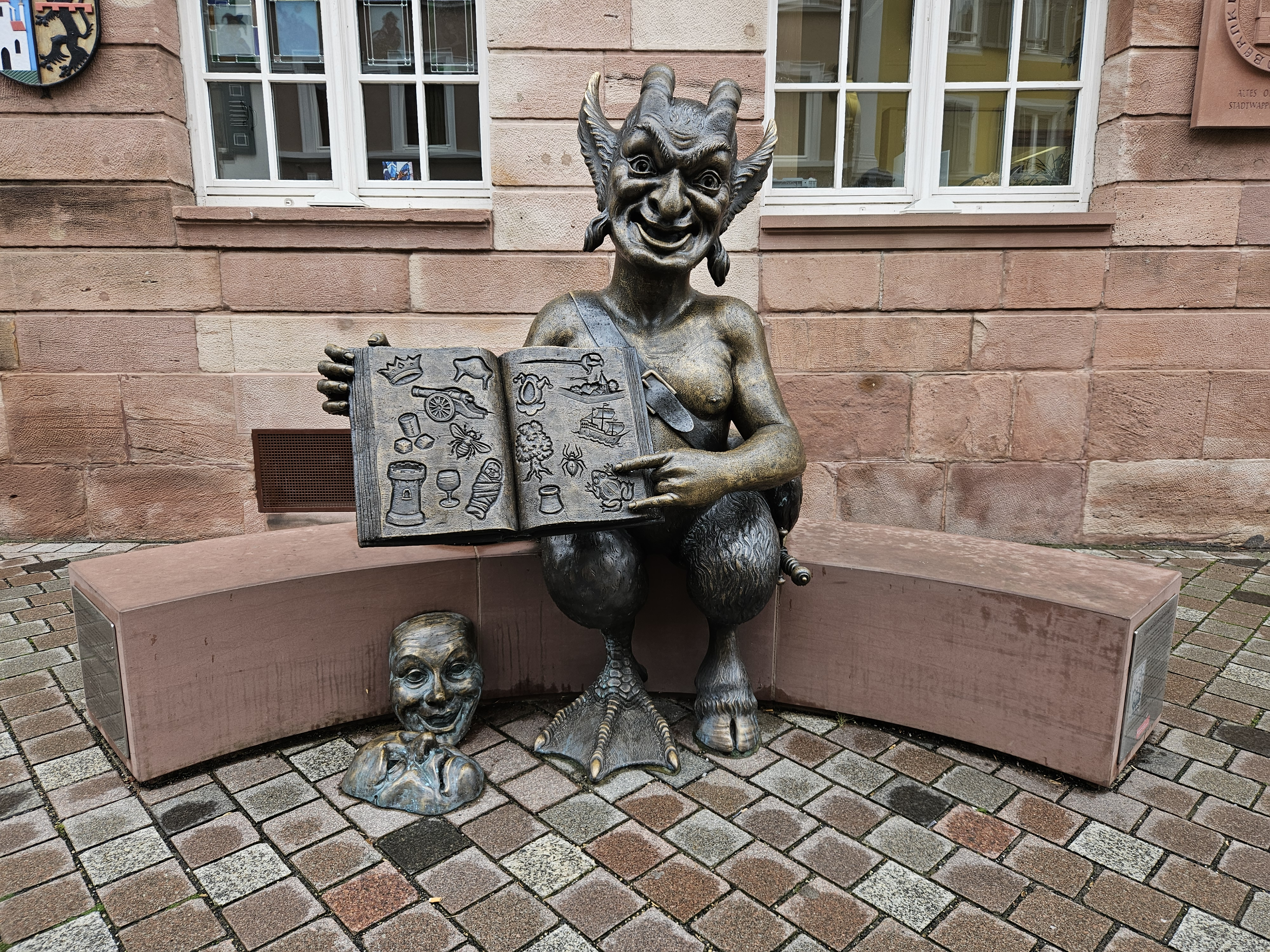
Monument to Grimmelshausen in Oberkirch

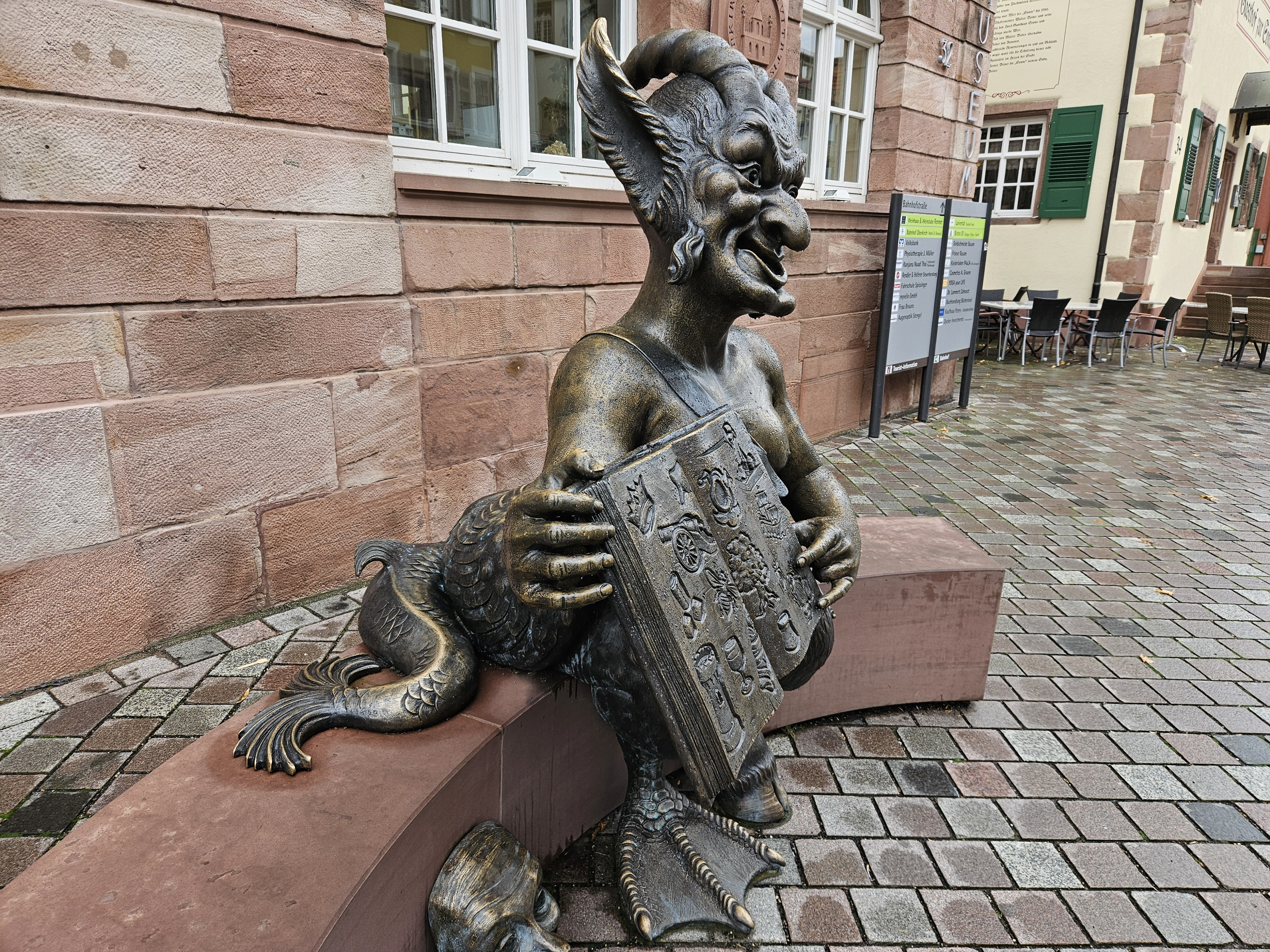
Monument to Grimmelshausen in Oberkirch

Much has been written on the frontispiece copperplate drawing (fig. top right) depicted an enigmatic winged monster holding an illustrated book. (Note: A survey of scholarship is given by Conny Bauer (1980), Phönix-Kupfer, cited by Gersch (2015), p. 3)

It has been described as a composite creature (a chimera) with the features of a goat, fish, bird, human, though "Satyr-head" (Satyrkopf, rather than goat/human) on a Chimera body, may be more apt, since the satyr is a wordplay of the "satirical" nature of the work, though the label "chimera", has been criticized as strictly incorrect, as it does not match the classical (Homeric) chimera of the lion-goat-serpent variety.

The creature is arguably identifiable as the "phoenix copper" (German: Phönix-Kupfer), an embodiment of "the purpose of the book", particularly since there is an accompanying poem about the phoenix copper written in couplets Nevertheless, some authors reject identification with the phoenix, and conclude only that the creature should be treated as an intricate poetological symbol.

The creature has also been interpreted as representing the true author himself (or his narrative work), with the book and the sword serving as mundane objects straightforwardly defining his identity, while the additional parts such as the wings (alluding to air) and the fins and fishtail (water) are allusive hints. This man has enacted many roles (indicated by the masks scattered on the floor), but presently is donning the mask of the "satirical actor" in order to perform the task of explaining the world to his audience while pointing-gesturing his book. The creature exists as a whole though made up of odd disparate parts, hence the title copperplate etching is an emblem that serves to preserve the "unity of the narrative about the I (ego)".

Jorge Luis Borges suggested that the frontispiece portrays shapeshifting Baldanders, but this proposal has not achieved general acceptance.

== Literary analysis ==
The novel is considered by some to contain autobiographic elements, inspired by Grimmelshausen's experience in the war. It has been reported that as a child Grimmelshausen was kidnapped by Hessian and Croatian troops where he eventually served as a musketeer. The historian Robert Ergang, however, draws upon Gustav Könnecke's Quellen und Forschungen zur Lebensgeschichte Grimmelshausens to assert that "the events related in the novel Simplicissimus could hardly have been autobiographical since [Grimmelshausen] lived a peaceful existence in quiet towns and villages on the fringe of the Black Forest and that the material he incorporated in his work was not taken from actual experience, but was either borrowed from the past, collected from hearsay, or created by a vivid imagination."

== Adaptions ==
=== Literary adaptions ===
The adventures of Simplicissimus became so popular that they were reproduced by authors in other European countries. Simplicissimus was recreated in French, English, and Turkish. A Hungarian Simplicissimus (Ungarischer oder Dacianischer Simplicissimus) was published in 1683. The author remained anonymous but is now generally considered to be Breslau-born Daniel Speer.

=== Opera ===
Johann Strauss II composed an operetta based on the novel.

20th-century composer Karl Amadeus Hartmann wrote the anti-war opera Simplicius Simplicissimus for chamber orchestra in the mid-1930s, with contributions to the libretto by his teacher Hermann Scherchen. It opens: "In A.D. 1618, 12 million lived in Germany. Then came the great war... In A.D. 1648 only 4 million still lived in Germany." It was first performed in 1948; Hartmann scored it for full orchestra in 1956. The chamber version (properly Des Simplicius Simplicissimus Jugend) was revived by the Stuttgart State Opera in 2004.

=== TV series ===
Abenteuerlicher Simplizissimus, a drama TV serial based on the book, was produced by ZDF and ORF in 1975.

=== Comic strip ===
The story was adapted into a newspaper comic strip by Raymond Lavigne and Gilbert Bloch in 1954.

== Literary references ==
German playwright Bertolt Brecht modelled his character of Mother Courage partially on the character of Courasche in his 1939 play Mutter Courage und ihre Kinder (Mother Courage and Her Children).

Grimmelshausen's Simplicissimus is used throughout John le Carré's novel A Perfect Spy (1986) as Magnus Pym's permanent key for one-time pad coding, and Pym's own life is represented as a picaresque. Grimmelshausen was used in other Le Carré novels as well. Le Carré was a medieval German scholar (as was his character George Smiley). Smiley tried to sell a prized Grimmelshausen first edition at the beginning of Tinker Tailor Soldier Spy (although it does not ultimately get sold).

Gunter Grass uses Grimmelshausen as a character in his book The Meeting at Telgte.

== Cultural legacy ==
=== Town mascot: Jägerken von Soest ===
The Hunter of Soest (German: Der Jäger von Soest) is one of the aliases Simplicius uses in the novel. The city of Soest developed this into the local mascot Das Jägerken von Soest (the little hunter of Soest) in 1976. Every year a citizen is selected, who then gets to represent the town and charitable projects of his choice in costume.

=== Simplicissimus House in Renchen ===
The Simplicissimus-Haus is a museum in the town of Renchen. It opened in 1998 and focuses on the reception of Grimmelshausen's works in modern art.

Right in front of it stands a 1977 bronze statue by Giacomo Manzù, showing Simplicius in his Hunter of Soest character.

== Editions ==
English translations include:

- Grimmelshausen, Hans Jakob Christoffel von (1912). The Adventurous Simplicissimus. Translated by Goodrick, Alfred Thomas Scrope (A.T.S.G.). London: William Heinemann. Archived from the original on 2023-01-11.
  - See also Project Gutenberg copy and later edition with new intro.
- —— (Spring 2002) The Simplicissimus Project, the 1912 translation by A. T. S. Goodrick with material added by students at the College of William & Mary.
- —— (1976) [1965]. "Simplicius Simplicissimus, translation and introduction by Schulz-Behrend, George. Indianapolis: Bobbs-Merrill Company. ISBN 978-0672604249
  - —— (1993). The Adventure of Simplicius Simplicissimus, translation and intrododuction by Schulz-Behrend, George. Columbia, South Carolina: Camden House (Studies in German Literature, Linguistics and Culture 1). ISBN 978-1879751385
- —— (2006) [1999]. Simplicissimus, translated by Mitchell, Mike (rev. ed.). Dedalus. Shortlisted for the Oxford-Weidenfeld Translation Prize. ISBN 978-1903517420
- —— (2008). Simplicissimus, The German Adventurer, translated by John C. Osborne, Newfound Press. ISBN 978-0-9797292-5-6
- —— (1986–2012). Simplicius Simplicissimus. Translated by Adair, Monte. Monte Frederick Adair. ISBN 978-3-941170-68-1. Free download.
- —— (2018). The Adventures of Simplicius Simplicissimus, translated by Underwood, J. A. Penguin Classics, ISBN 9780141982120

The German text is publicly available through Project Gutenberg: Simplicius Simplicissimus.

PDFs of the original German-language edition, bearing the date 1669 but probably published already in 1668, may be downloaded from the Badische Landesbibliothek Karlsruhe and from the Herzog-August Bibliothek Wolfenbüttel.

- —— (1989). Breuer, Dieter (ed.). Simplicissimus Teutsch. Werke. Vol. 1. Deutscher Klassiker Verlag. ISBN 9783618664604.
- —— (1956). Kelletat, Alfred (ed.). Der abenteuerliche Simplicissimus. Munich: Winkler.
