= Simplician Cycle =

17th-century novel series

- Simplicius Simplicissimus; The Continuation of Simplicissimus; The Life of Courage; Tearaway; The Wondrous Bird's Nest
- Author: Hans Jakob Christoffel von Grimmelshausen
- Original title: Simplicianische Zyklus
- Country: Holy Roman Empire
- Language: German
- Published: 1668–1675

The Simplician Cycle (German: Simplicianische Zyklus) is a series of German picaresque novels written by Hans Jakob Christoffel von Grimmelshausen and published from 1668 to 1675.

== Description ==
The novels are set during and after the Thirty Years' War and follow characters who serve as soldiers, engage in petty crime, take on odd jobs and receive and commit abuse.

The cycle starts with the five-volume Simplicius Simplicissimus, published in 1668, which is the most famous and influential entry. Steven Moore describes it as the beginning of the modern German novel and "one of the greatest novels of the 17th century". Simplicius Simplicissimus received a Continuation in one book in 1669, which is about the same character and can be viewed as an addition to the original novel or as the first sequel.

Three more sequels followed, sharing some characters and other elements. The Life of Courage from 1670 is about the woman Courage who responds to her negative portrayal in Simplicius Simplicissimus. Tearaway from 1670 follows the various careers of one of Courage's temporary lovers. The two-volume The Wondrous Bird's Nest from 1672 and 1675 is about a bird's nest which can make people invisible, and two men who have it in their possession for a period each. Throughout the cycle are shared themes of fortune's inconsistency, the prevalence of evil and Christian messages.

== Volumes ==
Vol.	Year	English title	Original title
1–5	1668	Simplicius Simplicissimus	Der abenteuerliche Simplicissimus Teutsch
6	1669	The Continuation of Simplicissimus	Continuatio
7	1670	The Life of Courage	Trutz Simplex
8	1670	Tearaway	Der seltsame Springinsfeld
9	1672	The Wondrous Bird's Nest (I)	Das wunderbarliche Vogel-Nest
10	1675	The Wondrous Bird's Nest (II)	Deß Wunderbarlichen Vogelnessts Zweiter theil
