= Courage (newspaper) =

German feminist newspaper

Courage was a German feminist newspaper published monthly from 1976 to 1984.

== History ==
Courage was founded in 1976 by a group of ten Berlin women from the Kreuzberg Women's Centre who wished to create an autonomous leftist-feminist newspaper. Although they had little prior journalistic training and no start-up capital, their aim was to encourage other women to advocate for increasing power and political responsibility. The title was inspired by the central character of Bertolt Brecht's 1939 play Mother Courage and Her Children, whom the editors saw as a "self-directed woman ... not a starry-eyed idealist but neither is she satisfied with the status quo". To raise funds for the printing of the first issue, the editors held a women's festival in Berlin. For the first year of publication, the staff of Courage worked as volunteers but by 1978 the newspaper's sales were high enough that they were able to earn a reasonable wage for their work.

Courage published articles about a number of taboo topics, and aimed to represent a diverse variety of opinions from within the feminist movement. Some of the issues addressed by Courage's writers included abortion, forced prostitution, women's sexuality, systematic exclusion of women in male-dominated fields, sexual violence, child abuse, women in the military, menstruation, and female genital mutilation. The newspaper's circulation began at 5,000 and had increased to 20,000 by the third issue; it peaked in the late 1970s with a readership of over 70,000.

Four months after the first issue of Courage was released, another group of German women created Emma, another feminist newspaper (later published as a magazine, and still in publication as of 2011). Before Emma's first publication, the editors of Courage offered to work together to create a single newspaper but were turned away. Tensions were high and disputes common between the editing teams of both newspapers as they competed in the same market and often published opposing interpretations of feminism. Faced with criticism from Emma and the male press, conflicts arose amongst the Courage editors as the newspaper's readership fell. In 1984, they declared bankruptcy and Courage ceased publication.

The title Courage (French for "courage") refers to the main character of Hans Jakob Christoffel von Grimmelshausen's novel The Life of Courage "as a symbol of the militant, independently acting woman".
