= Curse (video game) =

1989 video game

- Developer: Micronet
- Publisher: Micronet
- Platform: Mega Drive
- Release: JP: December 23, 1989
- Genre: Scrolling shooter
- Mode: Single-player

Curse (カース, Kāsu) is a 1989 scrolling shooter video game developed by Micronet for the Mega Drive. Although an American release was planned, it was never officially released outside Japan.

== Plot ==
The story takes place in an alien solar system and focuses on the history of its two inhabited planets: Parceria and Seneca. For many years, the people of these planets lived in harmony together with the seemingly more advanced Parcerians continually visiting the Senecans. However, on Parceria, something caused the Parcerians to shut off all forms of communication, visitation and activity with Seneca. Over time, Parceria's environment died out, leaving only a planet-wide barren terrain. Hundreds of years have now passed and the current generation of Senecans see Parceria as nothing but a dead husk with the concept of life and companionship on it being mere, long forgotten legends.

One day, an enormous attack force flies from Parceria and attacks Seneca without warning. Confirmed to be the Parcerian Military, the invaders cripple Seneca's defense forces. Besides being well armed and equipped, the Parceria Military is also able to manipulate the wildlife to do its bidding through unknown means, ensuring no possible escape to safety. The desperate people of Seneca eventually discovered an ancient star fighter abandoned by the Parcerians called the Baldanders. Using its super-technology, the people of Seneca use the Baldanders in a counter-attack against the Parcerian invasion to destroy their main battleship: a large, mysterious warship known only as 'Mother'.

== Gameplay ==
Curse is similar to many other sideways/horizontal scrolling shooters, most notably R-Type. Various power-ups can be collected to boost weapons and speed. The object of the game is to shoot all other enemies that appear on screen and avoid crashing into bullets, enemies or foreground scenery. There are end-of-level boss enemies that stay with the player until they are defeated. There are no difficulty settings but the extends (aka: 1ups) are awarded every 1 million points.

The Baldanders star fighter has an advantage over most scrolling shooter ships at the time in that it is equipped with a shield. When players are hit by bullets or missiles, the shield takes a hit for the ship. The shield can take three hits total before the player's ship is destroyed. Players are equipped with a standard laser shot that can be upgraded when certain power-ups are collected. The player has access to three different upgradable weapons: the V-Laser which fires in three directions, the Wide Beam which can shoot through every foreground object (except for the flying orange iron rock objects) and the Crash Shot a slow firing cluster of gray, explosive crystals that scatter shrapnel in the opposite direction of its impact. Other items includes Homing Missiles which scan over terrain, shield Energy pick-ups, Speed-Ups and Options.

The Options increase the number of the player's standard laser shots and allows the player to fire standard shots upwards, backwards and downwards depending on each Option's direction. Two could be collected at one time. The player can rotate them to two fixed directions: horizontal and vertical using the C button. The player can also use each sphere as a shield against most enemy fire. The Baldanders is equipped with the iconic Shmup Smart Bomb weapon which destroys all enemies and/or enemy shots on the screen using the A button. The Bomb however does not have its own pick-up icon: in order to supply the ship with more bombs, the player has to upgrade either one of the three items available to them completely by picking up the same icon three times in a row. Once the weapon is upgraded, the next icon of the same weapon the player uses adds to the bomb supply.

== Reception ==
Reception

Review scores
Publication	Score
Aktueller Software Markt	3/12
Beep! MegaDrive	6.3/10
Computer and Video Games	85%
Mean Machines Sega	70%
Tilt	9/20
Console XS	28/100
Mega Drive Advanced Gaming	4%
MegaTech	70%
Power Play	23%
Sega Power	2/5
Sega Pro	25/100

Curse received a 4.0938/10 score in a 1995 readers' poll conducted by the Japanese Sega Saturn Magazine, ranking among Sega Mega Drive titles at the number 499 spot. The game also garnered generally unfavorable reviews from critics. MegaTech commended the game for being fun to play, but faulted its lack of originality and noted that, when the player loses, extra weapons are lost and it is difficult to continue since the game only has five levels. Console XS considered it to be the worst shoot 'em up ever on the Sega Mega Drive.
