= Mielitz =

Mielitz is a surname. Notable people with the surname include:

- Christine Mielitz (born 1949), German theatre and opera director
- Sebastian Mielitz (born 1989), German footballer
