= Tearaway (novel) =

1670 novel by Hans Jakob Christoffel von Grimmelshausen

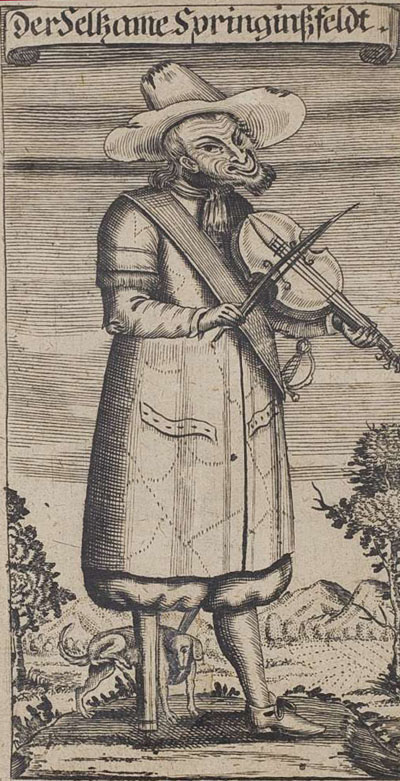
- Frontispiece
- Author: Hans Jakob Christoffel von Grimmelshausen
- Original title: Der seltzame Springinsfeld
- Language: German
- Series: Simplician Cycle
- Genre: picaresque
- Publisher: Felix Stratiot
- Publication date: 1670
- Publication place: Nuremberg
- Pages: 250

Tearaway (German: Der seltzame Springinsfeld, lit. 'The Curious Springinsfeld') is a 1670 novel by the German writer Hans Jakob Christoffel von Grimmelshausen. It is a picaresque novel that follows the unscrupulous Tearaway during the Thirty Years' War and after, as he becomes a nefarious innkeper, a travelling musician, married twice, and reluctantly is confronted with Christian ideals. Tearaway is portrayed as wolflike and, in the second half, contrasted with culture.

The story is part of Grimmelshausen's Simplician Cycle and follows Simplicius Simplicissimus (1668) and The Life of Courage (1670). Tearaway features in the latter as one Courage's temporary partners. The cycle concluded with The Wondrous Bird's Nest (1672–1675).
