= Christine Mielitz =

German theatre and opera director

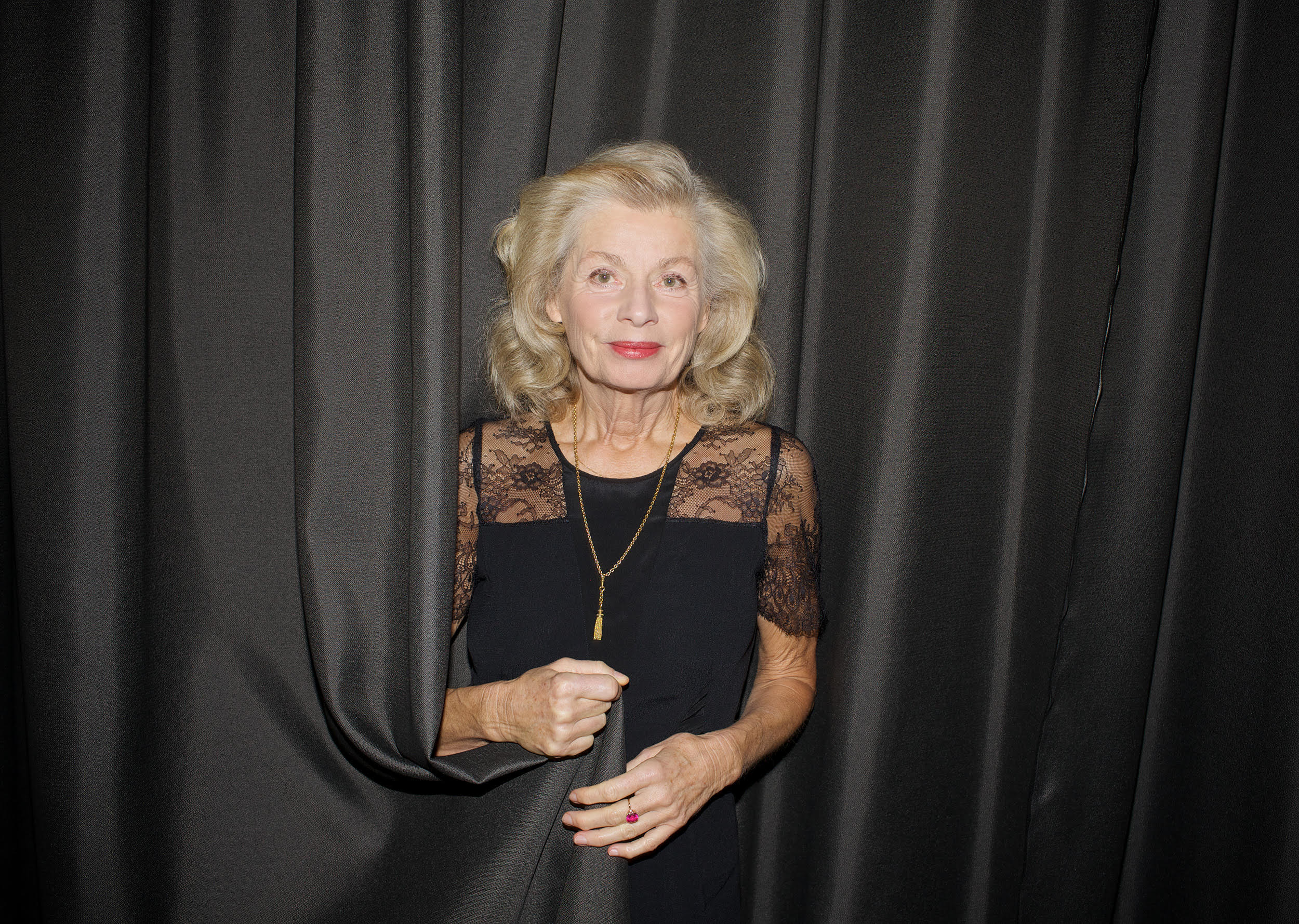
Christine Mielitz, portrait by Oliver Mark, Berlin 2015

Christine Mielitz (born 23 November 1949) is a German theatre and opera director.

== Life ==
Born in Chemnitz, Mielitz was the daughter of a Chemnitz concert master and therefore came into contact with music theatre at an early age. After finishing school, she studied opera directing with Götz Friedrich and Hans-Jochen Irmer at the Hochschule für Musik "Hanns Eisler" in East-Berlin from 1968 to 1972.

In the course of her studies Mielitz completed an internship with Harry Kupfer at the Dresden State Opera, which initially led to work as an assistant to Kupfers from 1973 and where she became a director from 1980. In the same year Verdi's Nabucco premiered in Wuppertal was her first own production. From 1982 she acted at the Dresdner Staatsoper as head director.

In 1989 she was engaged as a director at the Komische Oper Berlin, where she also took over as head director in 1992. From 1998 to 2002 she was artistic director of the Meiningen Court Theatre. In Meiningen she achieved a great international success with the first performance of the Der Ring des Nibelungen on four consecutive days, as Wagner always wished.

From 2002 to 2010 Mielitz was opera director of the Theater Dortmund. Since then she has worked as a guest director at the Vienna State Opera and the Dresden State Opera.

== Mises en scène ==
- Dresden
  - Abu Said by Eberhard Eyser (1980, premiere)
  - Rusalka by Antonín Dvořák (1981)
  - Lohengrin by Richard Wagner (1983)
  - La Bohème by Giacomo Puccini (1983)
  - Don Giovanni by Mozart (1987)
  - Orfeo ed Euridice by Christoph Willibald Gluck (1988)
  - Fidelio by Beethoven (1989)
- Komische Oper Berlin
  - Cavalleria Rusticana/Der Bajazzo by Pietro Mascagni, Ruggero Leoncavallo
  - Die schweigsame Frau by Richard Strauss (1990)
  - Rienzi by Richard Wagner (1992)
  - Werther by Jules Massenet (1995)
  - Macbeth by Giuseppe Verdi (1997)
  - Turandot by Giacomo Puccini (1998)
- Meiningen
  - Lady Macbeth von Mtzensk by Shostakovich, (1999)
  - The Bartered Bride by Bedřich Smetana (2000)
  - Der Ring des Nibelungen by Richard Wagner (2001)
- Dortmund
  - Der Ring des Nibelungen (2006 /07), Parsifal, Die Meistersinger von Nürnberg, Lohengrin and Der fliegende Holländer by Richard Wagner
  - Otello and Rigoletto by Giuseppe Verdi
  - Jenůfa by Leoš Janáček
  - Eugene Onegin by Tchaikowski
  - Wozzeck by Alban Berg
  - Madama Butterfly by Giacomo Puccini
  - Das Treffen in Telgte by Eckehard Mayer after gleichnamigen Erzählung by Günter Grass (Uraufführung)
  - Il trittico by Giacomo Puccini
  - Der junge Lord by Hans Werner Henze
  - Orpheus – Projekt by Christoph Willibald Gluck and Hans Werner Henze
- Guest productions
  - Rienzi by Richard Wagner, Nationaltheater Mannheim (1986)
  - Lady Macbeth of Mzensk by Shostakovich, Volksoper Wien (1991)
  - The Bartered Bride by Bedřich Smetana, Opernhaus Zürich (1988) and Toronto (1993)
  - Cavalleria Rusticana/Der Bajazzo by Mascagni and Leoncavallo, Tokio and Nagoya (1994)
  - The Jacobin by Antonín Dvořák, Edinburgh Festival (1995)
  - Peter Grimes by Benjamin Britten, Wiener Staatsoper (1996)
  - Rigoletto by Giuseppe Verdi, Basel (1996)
  - Tosca by Giacomo Puccini, Essen (1997)
  - Daphne by Richard Strauss, Salzburg and Badisches Staatstheater Karlsruhe (1999)
  - Der König Kandaules by Alexander von Zemlinsky, Salzburger Festspiele (2002)
  - Der Freischütz by Carl Maria von Weber, Sydney Opera House (2002)
  - Der fliegende Holländer and Parsifal by Richard Wagner, Wiener Staatsoper (2003/04)
  - The Tales of Hoffmann by Jacques Offenbach, Hamburgische Staatsoper (2007)
  - Manon Lescaut by Giacomo Puccini, Opernhaus Bonn (2011)
  - Gogol by Lera Auerbach, Theater an der Wien (2011, premiere)
