= Mother Courage (character) =

Fictional character

Mother Courage (German: Mutter Courage) is a character who originated in two works by Hans Jakob Christoffel von Grimmelshausen: she features briefly in his 1668 novel Simplicius Simplicissimus, and is the main character in his 1670 novel The Life of Courage. The character was taken up by 20th-century German dramatist Bertholt Brecht, who incorporated her in the title of his 1939 play Mutter Courage und ihre Kinder (Mother Courage and Her Children).

== Grimmelshausen character ==
Simplicius Simplicissimus is a picaresque novel written by Hans Jakob Christoffel von Grimmelshausen, published in 1668, with the sequel Continuatio appearing in 1669. Inspired by the events and horrors of the Thirty Years' War which devastated Germany from 1618 to 1648, which was first translated into English in 1912 as The Adventurous Simplicissimus. Mother Courage has a cameo role in Simplicius Simplicissimus, and reappears as the main character his novel The Life of Courage (German: Die Ertzbetrügerin and Landstörtzerin Courasche; also known as Trutz Simplex) which dates from around 1670.

== Brecht character ==
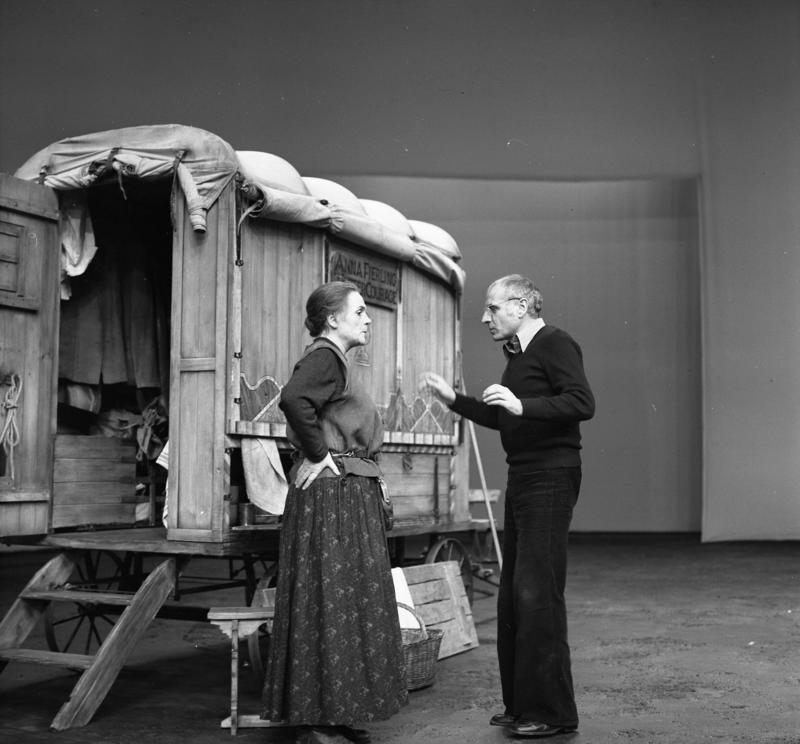
Manfred Wekwerth and Gisela May during rehearsals of Mother Courage and Her Children (1978)

The Bertolt Brecht play Mutter Courage und ihre Kinder (Mother Courage and Her Children), written in 1939 while Brecht was in exile in Sweden from Nazi Germany, gave her currency in the 20th century. In this play, a peddler called Anna Fierling is known as Mother Courage, but her character, according to scholar Ralf Remshardt, is "not derived in linear fashion from a precedent tale or prototype". Brecht's character may have also been shaped by Finnish-Swedish writer Johan Ludvig Runeberg's character in his the eponymous poem Lotta Svärd, about a woman who manned a field kitchen during the Finnish War. Both Svärd and Grimmelshausen's character Courasche are "formidable survivors" in the midst of war, and Brecht borrows the colouring, her promiscuity, and other details from Grimmelshausen's works.

Brecht's play, written on the cusp of World War II, was set during the Thirty Years' War, which devastated Germany from 1618 to 1648, as were Grimmelshausen's works. However Mutter Courage und ihre Kinder was not performed in his homeland until 1949, when a revised version was staged in East Berlin. The play stirred an emotional response in audiences owing to their experiences with World War II, and continues to be seen as a landmark drama of the 20th century, and a powerful anti-war piece.

== In popular culture ==
The first feminist restaurant in the United States, which operated in Greenwich Village, New York City, in the 1970s, was named Mother Courage.

The German feminist newspaper Courage, published from 1976 to 1984, was named after Mother Courage, whom the editors saw as a "self-directed woman... not a starry-eyed idealist but neither is she satisfied with the status quo".
