= Baldanders =

Creature of Germanic literary myth

Baldanders or Soon-Different is a creature of Germanic literary myth that features protean properties.

== Origin ==
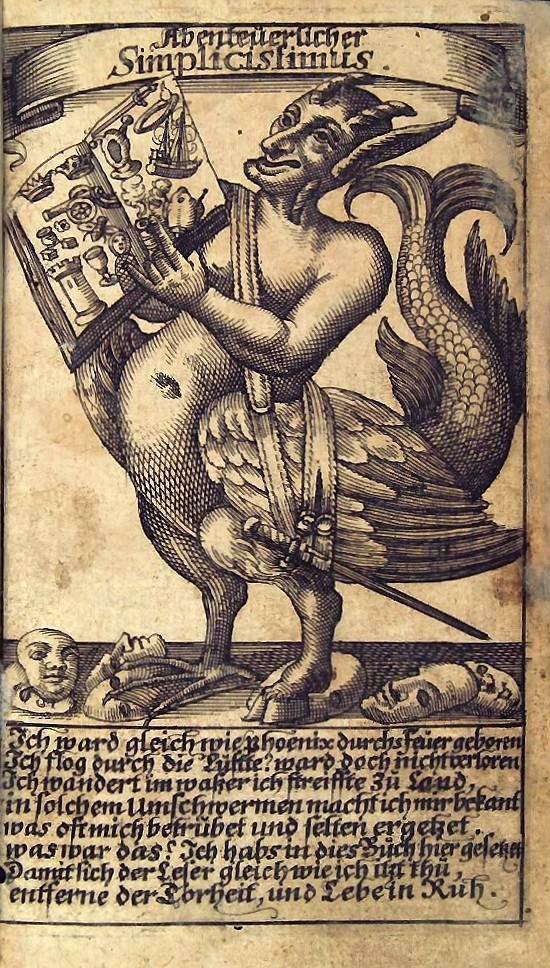
The frontispiece to Simplicius Simplicissimus

Baldanders (Soonchanged, Soon-Different) is a character in the novel Simplicius Simplicissimus by Grimmelshausen, appearing in its Continuatio (1669) or Sixth Book. The character was appropriated from Hans Sachs's poem Baldanderst [sic] dated to 31 July 1534. Hans Sachs probably derived his "Baldanderst" from Proteus, the shapeshifter of classical Greco-Roman mythology.

The hero of the story meets Baldanders when he stumbles upon a stone statue of an ancient Germanic hero, dressed in a Roman soldier's outfit with a large Swabian codpiece (i.e., Hosenlatz, or "flap of the breeches") (Schwabenlatz, literally "Swabian bib".). Baldanders claims to have met Sachs in July 1534, teaching the writer the secret art of conversing with inanimate objects. (Note: Thus Grimmelshausen's novel alludes to borrowing Baldanders from Sachs.) The protagonist begs to learn the art, and Baldanders offers to teach it, and administers a test in the form of a riddle consisting of a jumble of nonce words. Baldanders subsequently changes into a succession of forms: an oak tree, a sow, a bratwurst sausage, then a peasant's excrement, a meadow of clovers, cow dung (Kuhfladen), a flower, mulberry tree, and silk carpet. (Note: Here Simplicius comments that though he had not read Hans Sachs at that point, Balanders changing rapidly into different forms differed from what he read of Proteus according to Ovid's Metamorphoses.) The significance of these objects is that the oak produces acorns that are eaten by the female pig, then turned into sausage, and eaten by human, in a natural cycle of things that perish and are reborn.

According to Sachs’ and collected descriptions, the Baldanders is a creature that is symbolic for the continual change in nature and society as well as the importance of familiarizing oneself with the common from another perspective.

Jorge Luis Borges (El libro de los seres imaginarios) proposed controversially that Baldanders is depicted as the satyr-headed, winged, and fish-tailed composite creature in the Simplicius Simplicissimus' frontispiece.

== Popular culture ==
Baldanders is a regular character in the bi-weekly, alternate history webcomic What Happened When created by Andrew Scott and Carlos Morote.

The name Baldanders is also used for a recurring character in Gene Wolfe's science fantasy series The Book of the New Sun. Wolfe's Baldanders is an enormous, intellectually gifted giant whose relentless physical growth and self-directed evolution echo the original Baldanders' association with perpetual transformation.
