= Mother Courage and Her Children =

1939 play by Bertolt Brecht

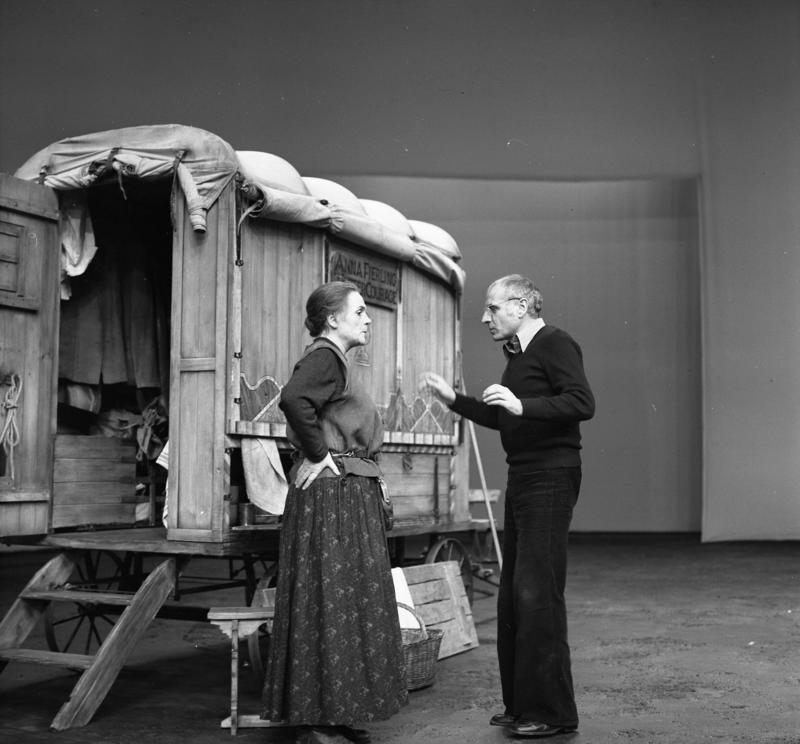
- Gisela May and Manfred Wekwerth during rehearsals of a 1978 production of Mother Courage and Her Children
- Original title: Mutter Courage und ihre Kinder
- Original language: German
- Written by: Bertolt Brecht
- Music by: Paul Dessau
- Characters: Mother Courage; Eilif; Schweizerkas
- Mute: Kattrin (Catherine)
- First publication: 1939
- Subject: War profiteering
- Genre: Epic theatre
- Setting: 17th century Europe

Premiere
- Date: April 19, 1941
- Place: Schauspielhaus Zürich
- Directed by: Leopold Lindtberg

Mother Courage and Her Children (German: Mutter Courage und ihre Kinder) is a play written in 1939 by the German dramatist and poet Bertolt Brecht (1898–1956), with significant contributions from Margarete Steffin. The name is based on its eponymous character, Mother Courage. Four theatrical productions were mounted in Switzerland and Germany between 1941 and 1952, the last three supervised or directed by Brecht, who had returned to East Germany from the United States.

Several years after Brecht's death in 1956, the play was adapted as a German film, Mutter Courage und ihre Kinder (1961), starring Helene Weigel, Brecht's widow and a leading actress. Several critics regard the play as the greatest of the 20th century.

== Synopsis ==
The play is set in the 17th century in Europe during the Thirty Years' War. The Recruiting Officer and Sergeant are introduced, both complaining about the difficulty of recruiting soldiers to the war. Anna Fierling (Mother Courage) enters pulling a cart containing provisions for sale to soldiers, and introduces her children Eilif, Kattrin, and Schweizerkas ("Swiss Cheese"). The sergeant negotiates a deal with Mother Courage while Eilif is conscripted by the Recruiting Officer.

Two years thereafter, Mother Courage argues with a Protestant General's cook over a capon, and Eilif is congratulated by the General for killing peasants and slaughtering their cattle. Eilif and his mother sing "The Fishwife and the Soldier". Mother Courage scolds her son for endangering himself.

Three years later, Swiss Cheese works as an army paymaster. The camp prostitute, Yvette Pottier, sings "The Fraternization Song". Mother Courage uses this song to warn Kattrin against involving herself with soldiers. Before the Catholic troops arrive, the Cook and Chaplain bring a message from Eilif. Swiss Cheese hides the regiment's paybox from invading soldiers, and Mother Courage and companions change their insignia from Protestant to Catholic. Swiss Cheese is captured and tortured by the Catholics, having hidden the paybox by the river. Mother Courage attempts bribery to free him, planning to pawn the wagon first and redeem it with the regiment money. When Swiss Cheese claims that he has thrown the box in the river, Mother Courage backtracks on the price, and Swiss Cheese is killed. Fearing to be shot as an accomplice, Mother Courage does not acknowledge his body, and it is discarded.

Later, Mother Courage waits outside the General's tent to register a complaint and sings the "Song of Great Capitulation" to a young soldier anxious to complain of inadequate pay. The song persuades both to withdraw their complaints.

Mother Courage grows desperate to protect her business, so much so that she refuses to give fabric to treat wounded civilians. The Chaplain takes her supplies anyway.

When Catholic General Tilly's funeral approaches, the Chaplain tells Mother Courage that the war will continue, and she is persuaded to pile up stocks. The Chaplain then suggests to Mother Courage that she marry him, but she rejects his proposal. Mother Courage curses the war because she finds Kattrin disfigured after being raped by a drunken soldier. Thereafter Mother Courage is again following the Protestant army.

While two peasants are trying to sell merchandise to her, they hear news of peace with the death of the Swedish king. The Cook appears and causes an argument between Mother Courage and the Chaplain. Mother Courage is off to the market while Eilif enters, dragged in by soldiers. Eilif is executed for killing a peasant while stealing livestock, trying to repeat the same act for which he was praised as hero in wartime, but Mother Courage never hears about this. When she finds out the war continues, the Cook and Mother Courage move on with the wagon.

In the seventeenth year of the war, there is no food and no supplies. The Cook inherits an inn in Utrecht and suggests to Mother Courage that she operate it with him – but he refuses to harbour Kattrin because he fears that her disfigurement will repel potential customers. Thereafter Mother Courage and Kattrin pull the wagon by themselves.

When Mother Courage is trading in the Protestant city of Halle, Kattrin is left with a peasant family in the countryside overnight. As Catholic soldiers force the peasants to guide the army to the city for a sneak attack, Kattrin fetches a drum from the cart and beats it, waking the townspeople, but is herself shot. Early in the morning, Mother Courage sings a lullaby to her daughter's corpse, has the peasants bury it, and hitches herself to the cart.

== Context ==
Mother Courage is one of nine plays that Brecht wrote in resistance to the rise of Fascism and Nazism. In response to the invasion of Poland by the German armies of Adolf Hitler in 1939, Brecht wrote Mother Courage in what writers call a "white heat"—in a little over a month. As the preface to the Ralph Manheim/John Willett Collected Plays puts it:

Mother Courage, with its theme of the devastating effects of a European war and the blindness of anyone hoping to profit by it, is said to have been written in a month; judging by the almost complete absence of drafts or any other evidence of preliminary studies, it must have been an exceptionally direct piece of inspiration.

Following Brecht's own principles for political drama, the play is not set in modern times but during the Thirty Years' War of 1618–1648, which involved all the German states, France and Sweden. It follows the fortunes of Anna Fierling, nicknamed "Mother Courage", a wily canteen woman with the Swedish Army, who is determined to make her living from the war. Over the course of the play, she loses all three of her children, Schweizerkas, Eilif, and Kattrin, to the very war from which she tried to profit.

== Overview ==
The name of the central character, Mother Courage, is inspired by the main character, Courasche, of the picaresque 17th-century German writer Grimmelshausen’s 1670 novel The Life of Courage. In the novel, Courasche (who does not have children) also struggles and connives her way through the Thirty Years' War in Germany and Poland. Otherwise the story is mostly Brecht's, in collaboration with Steffin.

The action of the play takes place over the course of 12 years (1624 to 1636), represented in 12 scenes. Some give a sense of Courage's career, but do not provide time for viewers to develop sentimental feelings and empathize with any of the characters. Meanwhile, Mother Courage is not depicted as a noble character. The Brechtian epic theatre distinguished itself from the ancient Greek tragedies, in which the heroes are far above the average. Neither does Brecht's ending of his play inspire any desire to imitate the main character, Mother Courage.

Mother Courage is among Brecht's most famous plays. Some directors consider it to be the greatest play of the 20th century. Brecht expresses the dreadfulness of war and the idea that virtues are not rewarded in corrupt times. He used an epic structure to force the audience to focus on the issues rather than getting involved with the characters and their emotions. Epic plays are a distinct genre typical of Brecht. Some critics believe that he created the form.

=== As epic theatre ===
Mother Courage is an example of Brecht's concepts of epic theatre and Verfremdungseffekt, or "V" effect; preferably "alienation" or "estrangement effect", Verfremdungseffekt is achieved through the use of placards which reveal the events of each scene, juxtaposition, actors changing characters and costume on stage, the use of narration, and simple props and scenery. For instance, a single tree would be used to convey a whole forest, and the stage is usually flooded with bright white light, whether the scene depicted is a winter's night or a summer's day. Several songs, interspersed throughout the play, are used to underscore the themes of the play. They also require the audience to think about what the playwright is saying.

== Roles ==
- Mother Courage (also known as "Canteen Anna")
- Kattrin (Catherine), her mute daughter
- Eilif, her older son
- Schweizerkas ("Swiss Cheese", also mentioned as Feyos), her younger son
- Recruiting Officer
- Sergeant
- Cook
- Swedish Commander
- Chaplain
- Ordinance Officer
- Yvette Pottier
- Man with the Bandage
- Another Sergeant
- Old Colonel
- Clerk
- Young Soldier
- Older Soldier
- Peasant
- Peasant Woman
- Young Man
- Old Woman
- Another Peasant
- Another Peasant Woman
- Young Peasant
- Lieutenant
- Voice

== Performances ==
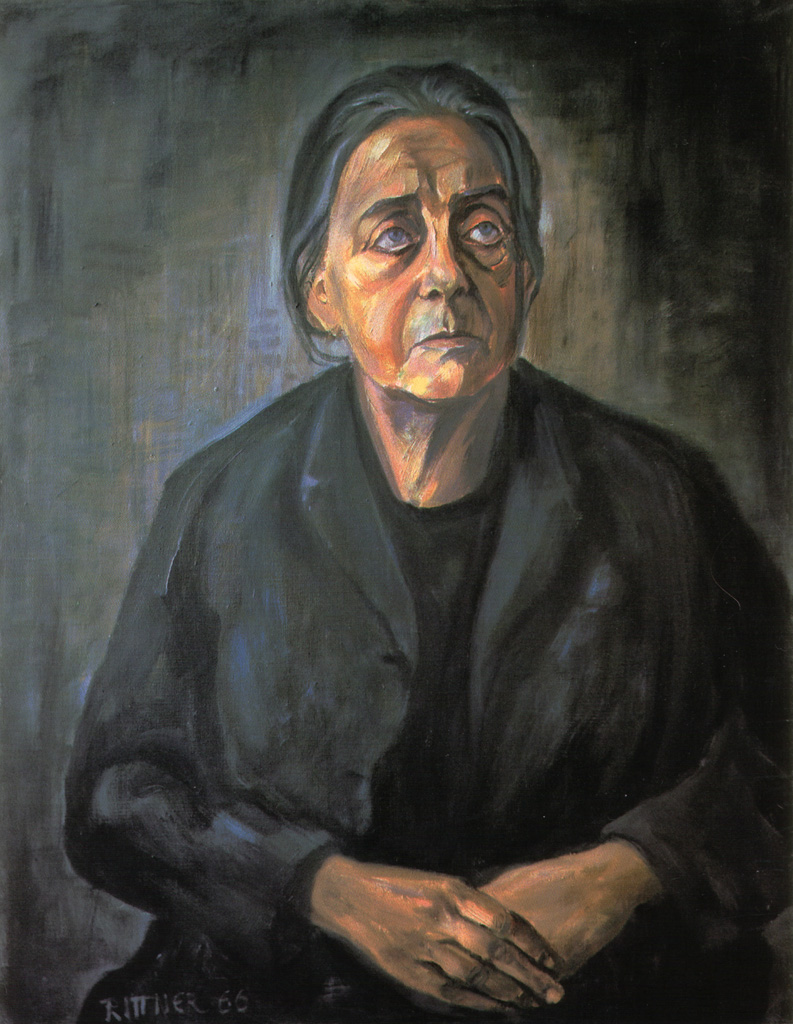
Therese Giehse as Mother Courage by Günter Rittner

=== In German ===
The play was originally produced at the Schauspielhaus Zürich, produced by Leopold Lindtberg in 1941. Most of the score consisted of original compositions by the Swiss composer Paul Burkhard; the rest had been arranged by him. The musicians were placed in view of the audience so that they could be seen, one of Brecht's many techniques in epic theatre. Therese Giehse, a well-known actress at the time, took the title role. Teo Otto designed the stage.

The second production of Mother Courage took place in then East Berlin in 1949, with Brecht's (second) wife Helene Weigel, his main actress and later also director, as Mother Courage. Paul Dessau supplied a new score, composed in close collaboration with Brecht himself. This production would highly influence the formation of Brecht's company, the Berliner Ensemble, which would provide him a venue to direct many of his plays. (Brecht died directing Galileo for the Ensemble.) Brecht revised the play for this production in reaction to the reviews of the Zürich production, which empathized with the "heart-rending vitality of all maternal creatures". Even so, he wrote that the Berlin audience failed to see Mother Courage's crimes and participation in the war and focused on her suffering instead.

The next production (and second production in Germany) was directed by Brecht at the Munich Kammerspiele in 1950, with the original Mother Courage, Therese Giehse, and with a set designed by Teo Otto (see photo, above.)

=== In English ===
- 1955 – London première at the Theatre Workshop, with Joan Littlewood in the title role.
- 1956 - American premiere by the Actor's Workshop at the (San Francisco) East Bay Kindeshule Sat.Feb. 4, 1956
- 1958 – American première at the Cleveland Play House, starring Harriet Brazier as Mother Courage, directed by Benno Frank, with set design by Paul Rodgers.
- 1959 – BBC television broadcast, adapted by Eric Crozier from Eric Bentley's English translation, produced by Rudolph Cartier, featuring Flora Robson as Mother Courage.
- 1961 – Second British production at Stratford-upon-Avon Amateur Players. Directed by American Keith Fowler and presented on the floor of the Stratford Hippodrome, it drew high acclaim. The title role was played by Elizabeth "Libby" Cutts, with Digby Day as Swiss Cheese.
- 1963 – First Broadway production at the Martin Beck Theatre, directed by Jerome Robbins, starring Anne Bancroft, and featuring Barbara Harris and Gene Wilder. It ran for 52 performances and was nominated for four Tony Awards. During this production Wilder first met Bancroft's then-boyfriend, Mel Brooks.
- 1971 – Staging of Brecht's original Berliner Ensemble production for the Melbourne Theatre Company at the Princess Theatre, directed by Joachim Tenschert. Gloria Dawn played Mother Courage.
- 1980 – New adaptation by Ntozake Shange at The Public Theater, set in the American South during Reconstruction, directed by Wilford Leach, with Gloria Foster as Mother Courage.
- 1982 – Multi-ethnic production by Internationalist Theatre at London's Theatre Space. Its "attack on the practice of war could not—with South Atlantic news (Falklands War) filling the front pages—have been more topical." Margaret Robertson played Mother Courage. and Angelique Rockas played Yvette
- 1984 – Royal Shakespeare Company production at the Barbican Theatre in London, translated by Hanif Kureishi, with Judi Dench in the title role.
- 1995 – Production at London's Royal National Theatre based on David Hare's translation, directed by Jonathan Kent, featuring Diana Rigg, who won an Evening Standard Theatre Award for her performance in the title role.
- 2006 – The Public Theater production in New York City, with a new translation by Tony Kushner, music by Jeanine Tesori, directed by George C. Wolfe, and starring Meryl Streep as Mother Courage.
- 2009 – Production at Royal National Theatre, directed by Deborah Warner, featuring Fiona Shaw in the title role, with new songs performed live by Duke Special.
- 2013 – All-indigenous Australian production at the Queensland Performing Arts Centre's Playhouse Theatre directed by Wesley Enoch, with a new translation by Paula Nazarski.
- 2024 – Blue Raincoat Theatre Company production in Sligo, Ireland at The Factory Performance Space.

=== In other languages ===
In Spanish, the play was first staged in Argentina with Alejandra Boero (1954, Buenos Aires), China Zorrilla (Montevideo, 1958), Cipe Lincovsky (1989, Buenos Aires), Amelia de la Torre (1966, Madrid), Mary Carrillo (1969, Valladolid), Maria Elena Sachero (Paraguay, 1980), Rosa María Sardá (1986, Madrid), Vicky Peña (2003, TNC-Barcelona), Laura García (2006, Teatro Libre, Bogotá).In 1972, Henry Jayasena adapted the play into Sinhalese, under the title Diriya Mawa Saha Agey Daruwo (The Brave Mother and Her Children). In 2003, a translation by Johannes Edfelt and Brita Edfelt was staged at the Royal Dramatic Theatre, with Stina Ekblad in the title role.

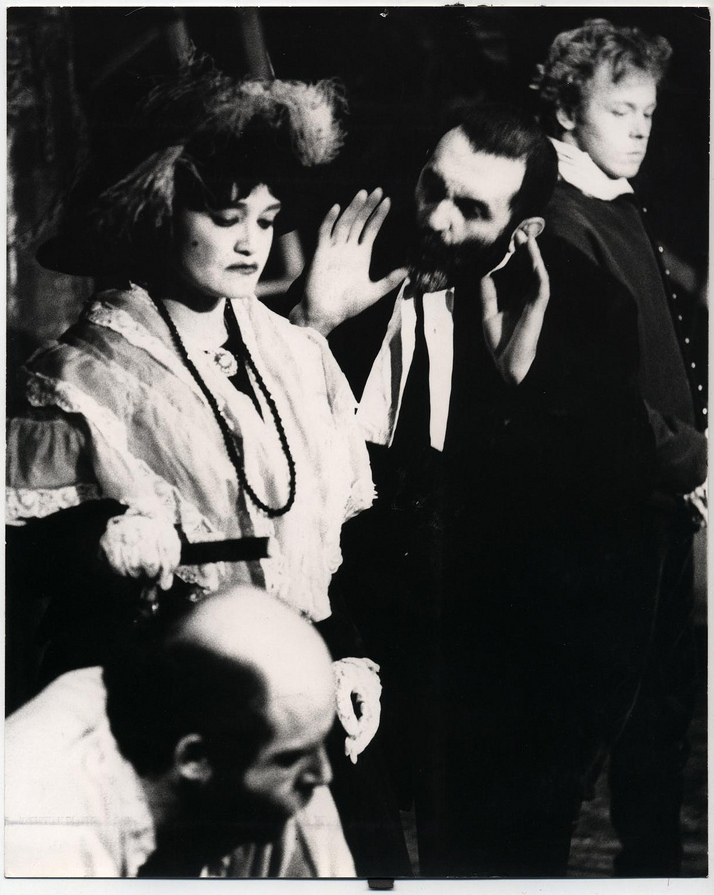
Angelique Rockas as Yvette and Renu Setna as The Chaplain (1982)

== Brecht's reaction ==
After the 1941 performances in Switzerland, Brecht believed critics had misunderstood the play. While many sympathized with the lead character, Brecht's goal was to show that Mother Courage was wrong for not understanding the circumstances she and her children were in. According to Hans Mayer, Brecht changed the play for the 1949 performances in East Berlin to make Courage less sympathetic to the audience. However, according to Mayer, these alterations did not significantly change the audience's sympathy for Courage.

Katie Baker, in a retrospective article about Mother Courage on its 75th anniversary, notes that "[Brecht's audiences] were missing the point of his Verfremdungseffekt, that breaking of the fourth wall which was supposed to make the masses think, not feel, in order to nudge them in a revolutionary direction." She also quotes Brecht as lamenting: "The (East Berliner) audiences of 1949 did not see Mother Courage's crimes, her participation, her desire to share in the profits of the war business; they saw only her failure, her sufferings."

== Critical reception ==
Mother Courage is considered by Oskar Eustis to be the greatest play of the 20th century, and perhaps also the greatest anti-war play of all time. Critic Brett D. Johnson points out, "Although numerous theatrical artists and scholars may share artistic director Oskar Eustis's opinion that Brecht's masterpiece is the greatest play of the twentieth century, productions of Mother Courage remain a rarity in contemporary American theatre."

== In popular culture ==
The first feminist restaurant in the United States, which operated in Greenwich Village, New York City in the 1970s, was named Mother Courage.

The German feminist newspaper Courage, published from 1976 to 1984, was named after Mother Courage, whom the editors saw as a "self-directed woman... not a starry-eyed idealist but neither is she satisfied with the status quo".

Mother Courage was the inspiration for Lynn Nottage's Pulitzer Prize-winning 2009 play Ruined, written after Nottage spent time with Congolese women in Ugandan refugee camps.

== English versions ==
- 1941 – Hoffman Reynolds Hays (1904–1980), translation for New Directions Publishing
- 1955 – Eric Bentley, translation for Doubleday/Garden City
- 1965 – Eric Bentley, translation, and W. H. Auden, songs translation, for the National Theatre, London
- 1972 – Ralph Manheim, translation for Random House/Pantheon Books
- 1980 – John Willett, translation for Methuen Publishing
- 1980 – Ntozake Shange, adaptation for New York Shakespeare Festival New York
- 1984 – Hanif Kureishi, adaptation, and Sue Davies, songs translation, for the Barbican Centre, London (Samuel French Ltd.)
- 1995 – David Hare, adaptation for the Royal National Theatre, London (A & C Black, 1996)
- 2000 – Lee Hall, adaptation, and Jan-Willem van den Bosch, translation, for Yvonne Arnaud Theatre, England (Methuen Drama, 2003)
- 2006 – Michael Hofmann, adaptation, and John Willett, songs translation, for the English Touring Theatre (A & C Black, 2006)
- 2006 – Tony Kushner, adaptation for The Public Theater, New York City, published in the form used in the 2009 Royal National Theatre production
- 2014 – David Hare, adaptation presented by the Arena Stage, Washington DC with Kathleen Turner as Mother Courage and featuring 13 new songs.
- 2014 – Wesley Enoch, adaptation, Queensland Theatre Company
- 2014 – David Edgar, translation for Stratford Festival, directed by Martha Henry
- 2015 – Ed Thomas for National Theatre Wales, site specific production with an all-female cast held at the Merthyr Tydfil Labour Club
- 2015 – Eamon Flack, adaptation, Belvoir St Theatre, Sydney.
- 2017 – Danielle Tarento direction of the Tony Kushner adaptation, Southwark Playhouse, London.
- 2019 – Adaptation by Anna Jordan for the Royal Exchange theatre, Manchester UK. Starring Julie Hesmondhalgh as Mother Courage.
- 2026 – Anna Jordan's adaptation for Shakespeare's Globe, London. Directed by Elle While, starring Michelle Terry as Mother Courage.

== Awards and nominations ==
=== Original Broadway production ===
Year	Award	Category	Nominee	Result
1963	Tony Award	Best Play		Nominated
1963	Tony Award	Best Featured Actress in a Play	Zohra Lampert	Nominated
1963	Tony Award	Best Costume Design	Motley	Nominated
1963	Tony Award	Best Producer	Cheryl Crawford and Jerome Robbins	Nominated

== See also ==
- List of plays with anti-war themes
