= The Wondrous Bird's Nest =

1672–1675 novel by Grimmelshausen

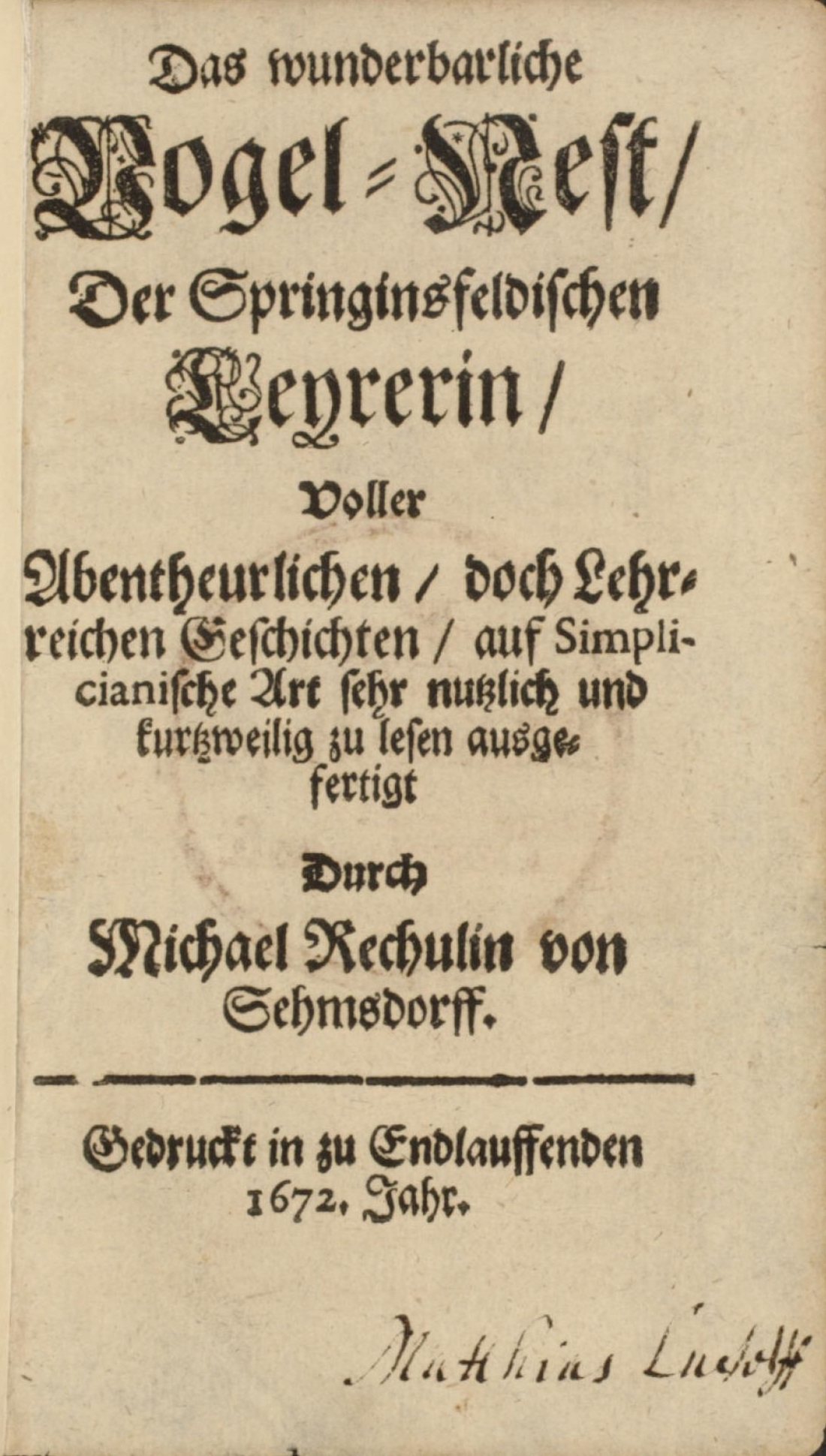
- Title page of the first volume
- Author: Hans Jakob Christoffel von Grimmelshausen
- Original title: Das wunderbarliche Vogel-Nest
- Language: German
- Series: Simplician Cycle
- Genre: picaresque novel
- Publication date: 1672–1675
- Pages: 647

The Wondrous Bird's Nest (German: Das wunderbarliche Vogel-Nest) is a picaresque novel by the German writer Hans Jakob Christoffel von Grimmelshausen, published in two volumes in 1672 and 1675. It revolves around a bird's nest which magically can make people invisible. In the first part, a man named Michael uses the nest to prevent bad deeds, and in the second, it is in the possession of an unscrupulous and egoistic merchant.

The Wondrous Bird's Nest is the concluding two volumes of Grimmelshausen's Simplician Cycle. It follows Tearaway from 1670, which introduced the magic bird's nest in a subplot. The Wondrous Bird's Nest stands out from the preceding parts by not being set during the Thirty Years' War but after it. According to Steven Moore, Grimmelshausen used The Wondrous Bird's Nest to suggest that the world at peace is just as dangerous as during wartime.
