= The Life of Courage =

1670 novel by Hans Jakob Christoffel von Grimmelshausen

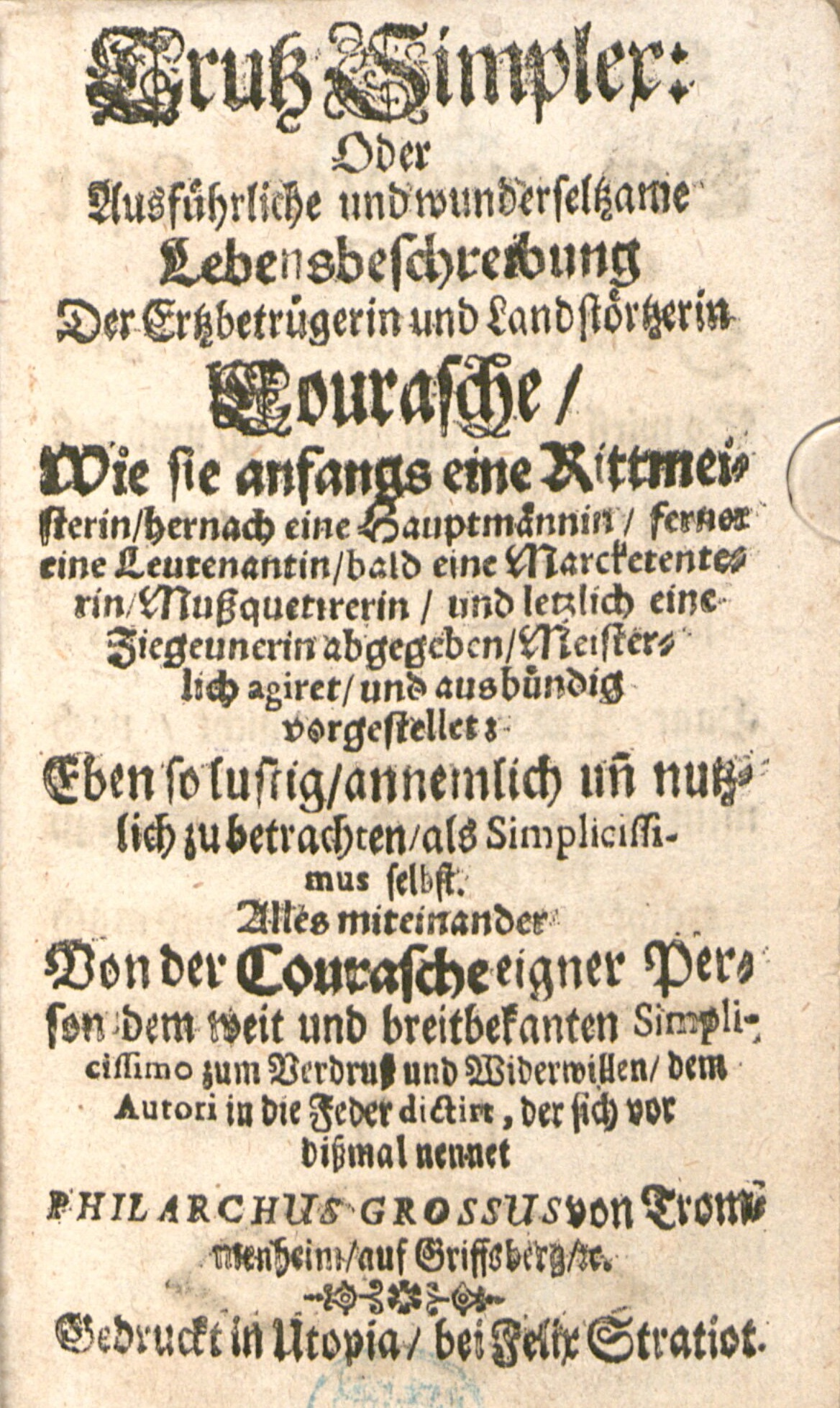
- Title page
- Author: Hans Jakob Christoffel von Grimmelshausen
- Original title: Trutz Simplex
- Language: German
- Genre: picaresque
- Publisher: Felix Stratiot
- Publication date: 1670
- Publication place: Nuremberg
- Pages: 263

The Life of Courage: The Notorious Thief, Whore and Vagabond (German: Trutz Simplex oder Lebensbeschreibung der Ertzbetrügerin und Landstörtzerin Courasche) is a 1670 novel by the German writer Hans Jakob Christoffel von Grimmelshausen. It has also been published in English as Courage, the Adventuress and the False Messiah and The Runagate Courage.

It is a picaresque novel that follows Courage, an adventurous, promiscuous and sometimes abused woman during the time of the Thirty Years' War. It is part of the Simplician Cycle and a sequel to Grimmelshausen's novel Simplicius Simplicissimus, published in 1668, where Courage appears as a minor character.

== Background ==
Hans Jakob Christoffel von Grimmelshausen's picaresque novel Simplicius Simplicissimus was published in five books in 1668 and became a great success. In 1669, Grimmelshausen followed it by a book called Continuation, which can be seen as an addition to the original novel or as the first of several sequels. Toward the end of Simplicius Simplicissimus, the main character Simplicius seduces and abandons an unnamed woman described as a "man-trap" whose "easy virtue soon disgusted him". Nine months later, she leaves a baby at his door, which he reluctantly accepts as his rightful son. The Life of Courage is a sequel to Simplissicus and develops the character of this woman. Two of Grimmelshausen's major influences were The Comical History of Francion (1623) by Charles Sorel and La pícara Justina (1605) by Francisco López de Úbeda.

== Plot ==
Courage is the woman Simplicius seduced and abandoned. She has read Simplicius Simplicissimus and is angry about her portrayal in the novel, so she decides to tell her own story. She reveals herself as an adventuress who has gone through many relationships of varying duration and degrees of abuse. The story is mostly in a realistic mode with a few supernatural elements.

Courage is originally from Bohemia and her real name is Libuschka. When she is 13, she avoids being raped by soldiers during the Thirty Years' War by disguising herself as a man. She joins the army and learns to drink and swear like a soldier. Other troopers discover she is a woman during a fight, in which she calls her vulva Courage, which becomes her nom de guerre.

Over many years, she has a series of marriages with soldiers and is raped by other soldiers. She is a prostitute for a period. She becomes a merchant on the black market. She is unashamed in her sexual desire and unscrupulous in the ways she handles the wartime situation, marrying whoever offers shelter. Most of her marriages end within a year due to the deaths of her husbands. She becomes a full-on criminal for a period when she joins a Gypsy gang. She is infected with syphilis. According to Courage, the child she left at Simplicius's doorstep was not hers but her maid's.

== Legacy ==
The main character in Grimmelshausen's next novel Tearaway, also published in 1670, is one of the men Courage has a longer relationship with in The Life of Courage, before she leaves him because of his drunkenness and violence toward her. In Tearaway, he ends up as a member of Simplicius' group, and encounters the scribe Courage enlisted to write down her story.

Bertolt Brecht used Courage as the main character in his 1939 play Mother Courage and Her Children. She features under the name Libuschka in the 1979 novel The Meeting at Telgte by Günter Grass.
