= The Meeting at Telgte =

1979 novel by Günter Grass

- First edition (German)
- Author: Günter Grass
- Original title: Das Treffen in Telgte
- Translator: Ralph Manheim
- Language: German
- Publisher: Luchterhand
- Publication date: 1979
- Publication place: West Germany
- English publication date: 1981
- Pages: 182
- ISBN: 347286480X

The Meeting at Telgte (German: Das Treffen in Telgte) is a 1979 novel by the West German writer Günter Grass. The narrative revolves around a fictional meeting for intellectuals hosted by Simon Dach during the Thirty Years' War. The story combines a depiction of leading seventeenth-century literary figures with an analogy for the post-World War II society in Germany, and of Group 47 in West Germany, of which Grass was a member.

== Reception ==
Theodore Ziolkowski wrote in The New York Times that "Grass has chosen his historical analogy with brilliant precision" and that "the book is diverting as a history of 17th-century German literature, liberally sprinkled with quotations from the works and poetic treatises of the period." Ziolkowski continued: "All in all, however, the story remains a lifeless literary construct. The author, whose unerring sense of place put his native Danzig on the literary map along with Kafka's Prague, Joyce's Dublin, and Bellow's Chicago, has not succeeded in giving us a persuasive Westphalian town of the 17th century. With the exception of Dach and the young Grimmelshausen, whose ebullient novels anticipated Grass's own explosive works, none of the literary figures comes alive."

== See also ==
- 1979 in literature
- German literature
