= Hans Jakob Christoffel von Grimmelshausen =

German novelist (1621/2–1676)

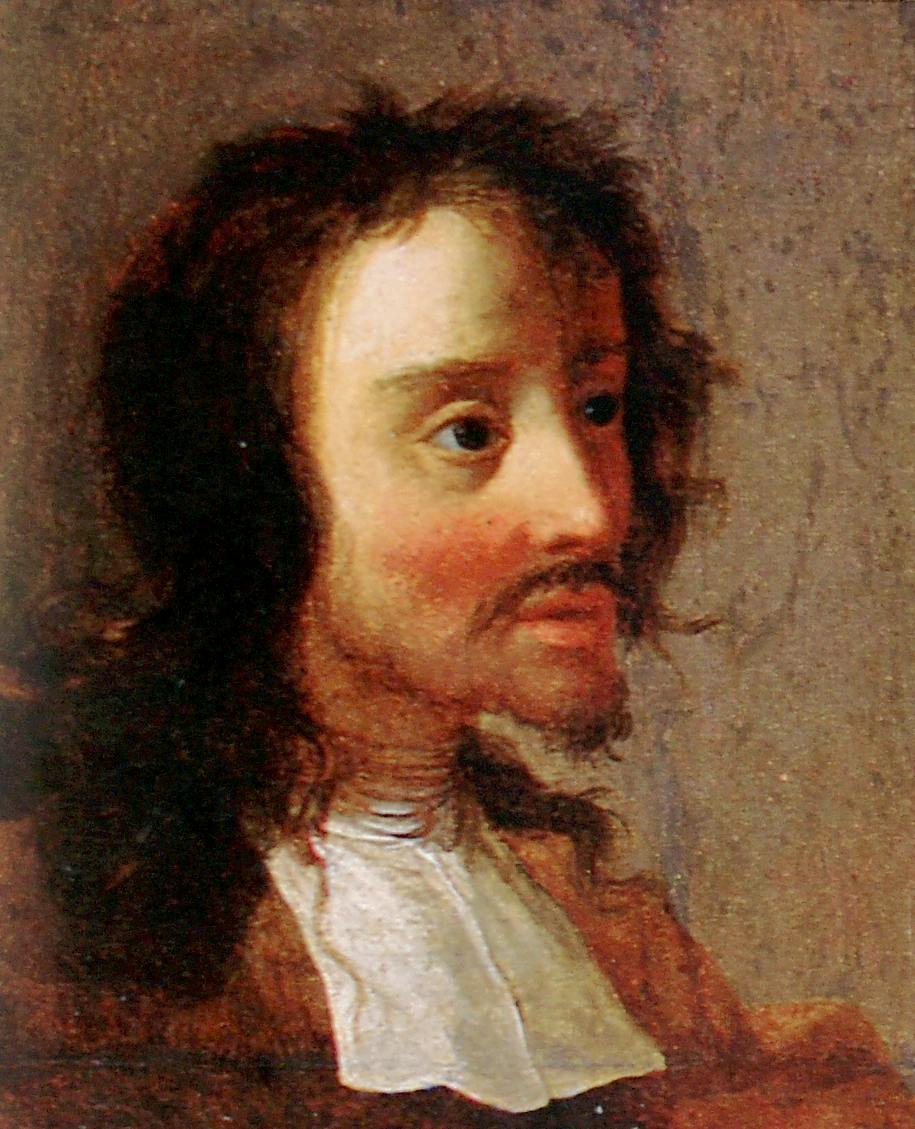
- 1641 portrait claimed to show Grimmelshausen
- Born: 1621 or 1622; Gelnhausen, County of Hanau, Holy Roman Empire
- Died: 17 August 1676; Renchen, Margraviate of Baden, Holy Roman Empire
- Occupation: Writer
- Spouse: Katharina Henninger
- Writing career
- Pen name: German Schleifheim von Sulsfort; various anagrams of his name (Note: List of pseudonyms attributed (as anagrams) to Grimmelshausen: Samuel Greiffensohn von Hirschfeld German Schleifheim von Sulsfort Melchior Sternfels von Fugshaim Philarchus Grossus von Trommenheim Michael Rechulin von Sehmsdorf Eric Steinfels von Grufenshohn Simon Lengfrisch von Hartenfels Israel Fromschmid von Hugenfels)
- Language: German
- Period: Baroque-era Germany
- Genres: Novel, Allegory, Satire
- Notable work: Simplicius Simplicissimus; The Life of Courage
- Movement: German Baroque

Hans Jakob Christoffel von Grimmelshausen (1621/22 – 17 August 1676) was a German author. He is best known for his 1669 picaresque novel Simplicius Simplicissimus (German: Der abenteuerliche Simplicissimus) and the accompanying Simplician Cycle series, including The Life of Courage.

== Early life ==
Grimmelshausen was born at Gelnhausen. At the age of ten, he was kidnapped by Hessian soldiers, and in their midst experienced military life in the Thirty Years' War. In 1639, he became a regular soldier in the Imperial Army. At the latest, in the year 1644 he worked as a writer in a regiment's chancellery—from that year on documents by Hans Jakob Christoffel exist. At the close of the war, Grimmelshausen entered the service of Franz Egon von Fürstenberg, Catholic bishop of Strasbourg. Subsequent to the peace, Grimmelshausen converted to Catholicism, although certain accounts indicate that his conversion occurred in the late 1630s. In 1665, he was made magistrate (German: Schultheiß) at Renchen in Baden. On obtaining this appointment, he devoted himself to literary pursuits.

== Works ==
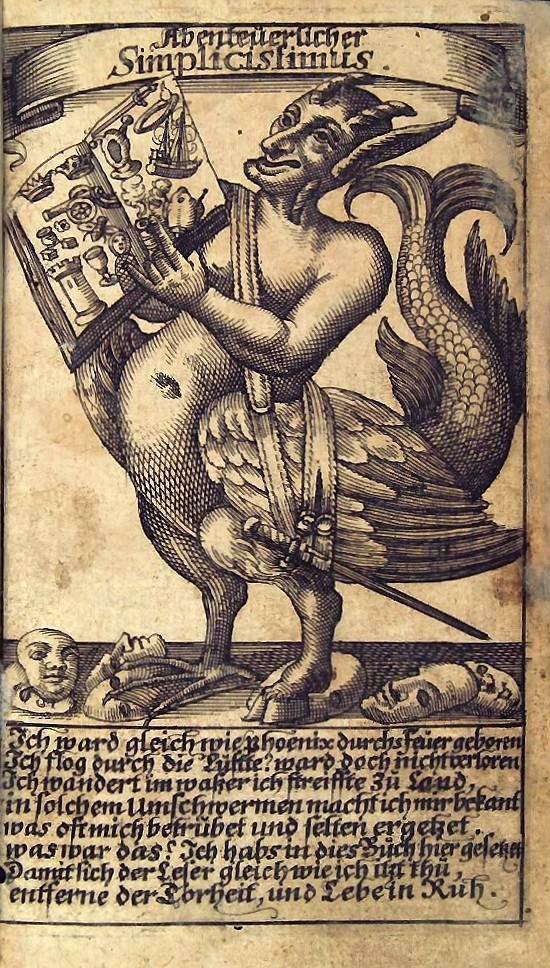
Abenteuerlicher Simplicissimus, frontispiece of an early edition

Grimmelshausen's work is greatly influenced by previous utopian and travel literature, and the Simplicissimus series attained a readership larger than any other seventeenth-century novel. Formerly, he was credited with Der fliegende Wandersmann nach dem Mond, a translation from Jean Baudoin's L'Homme dans la Lune, itself a translation of Francis Godwin's The Man in the Moone, but recent scholars have disputed this; he did, however, write an appendix to a 1667 edition of that translation, the basis for that association. Der fliegende Wandersman was included in his collected works, though without the appendix.

In 1668, Grimmelshausen published Der abenteuerliche Simplicissimus, which has been called the greatest German novel of the 17th century. For this work he took as his model the picaresque romances of Spain, already to some extent known in Germany. Simplicissimus has been interpreted as its author's autobiography; he begins with the childhood of his hero, and describes the latter's adventures amid the stirring scenes of the Thirty Years' War. The rustic detail with which these pictures are presented makes the book a valuable document of its time. For some, however, the later parts of the book overindulge in allegory, and finally become a Robinson Crusoe story.

Grimmelshausen wrote several sequels to Simplicissimus, the so-called Simplician Cycle or Simplicianische Schriften (German: Simplizianische Schriften):

- Die Ertzbetrügerin and Landstörtzerin Courasche (1670)
- Der seltsame Springinsfeld (1670)
- Das wunderbarliche Vogelnest (1672)

He also published satires, such as Der teutsche Michel (1673), and gallant novels, like Dietwald und Amelinde (1670).

== Death and legacy ==
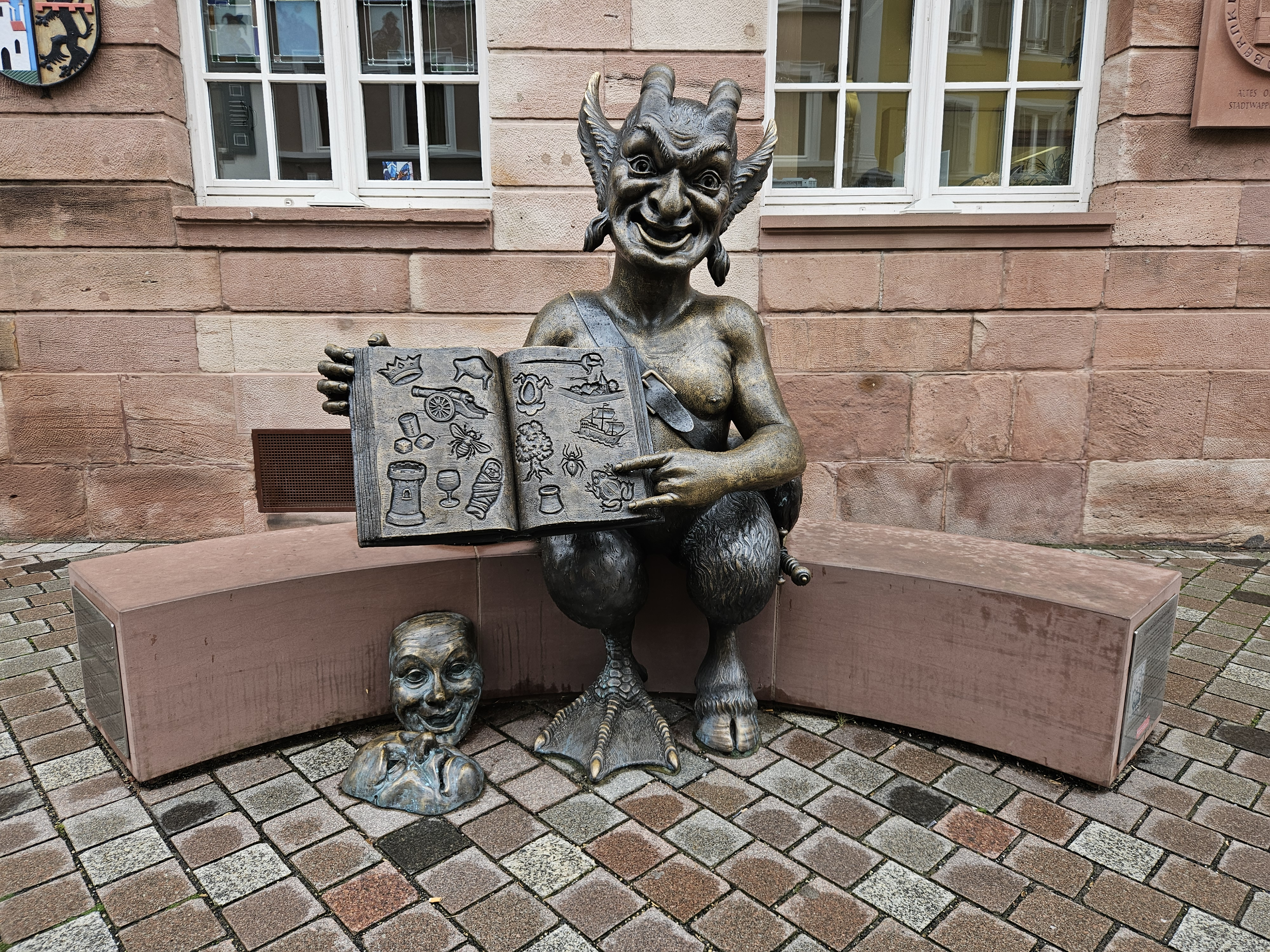
Monument to Grimmelshausen in Oberkirch

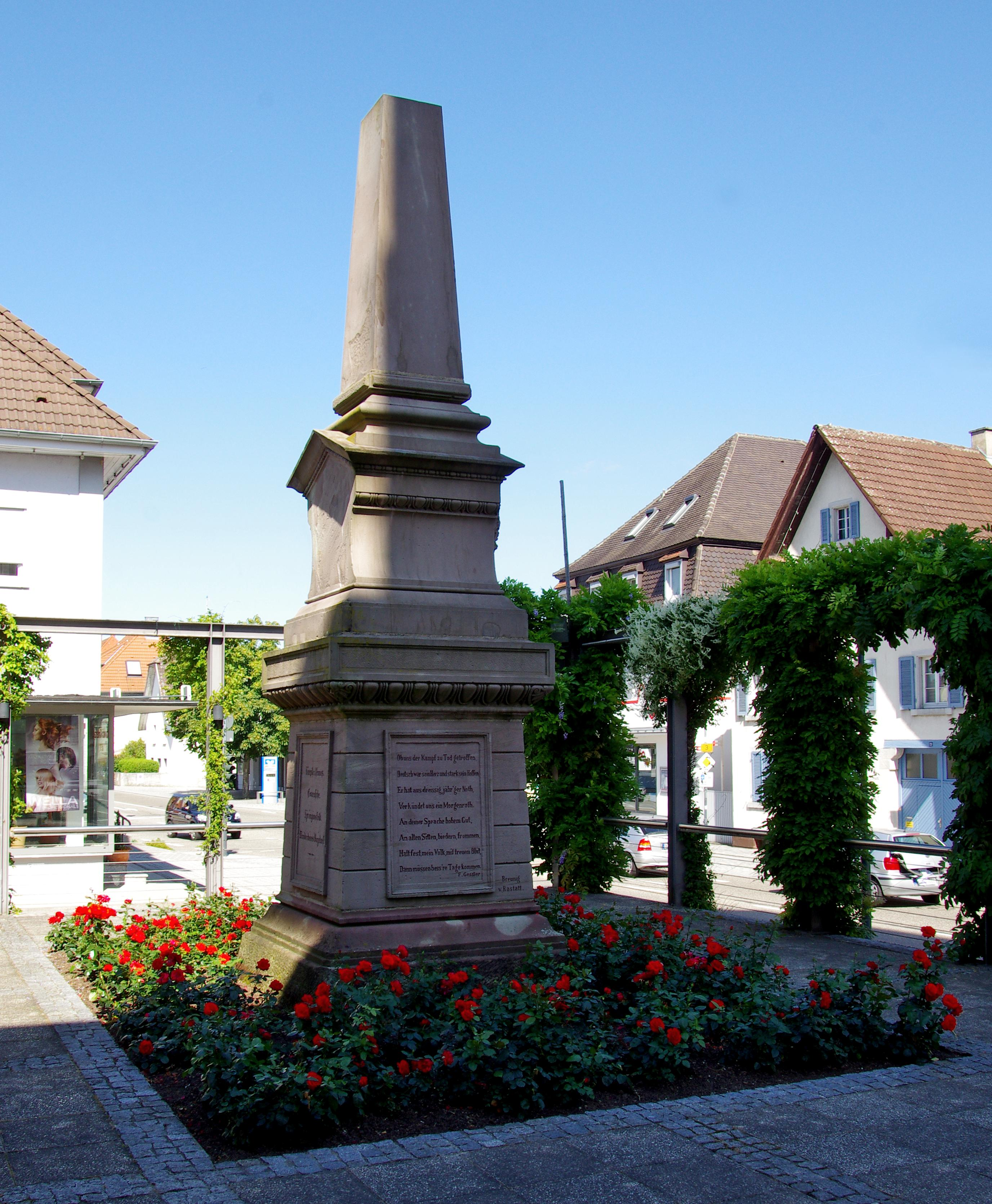
1879 Grimmelshausen monument in Renchen

Grimmelshausen died in Renchen in 1676, where a monument was erected to him in 1879.

His Landstörtzerin Courasche became an inspiration for Bertolt Brecht's play Mother Courage and Her Children.

Der abenteuerliche Simplicissimus lent its name to Simplicissimus, a satirical German weekly which ran from 1894 to 1944 and 1954 to 1967.
