= Jules Verne bibliography =

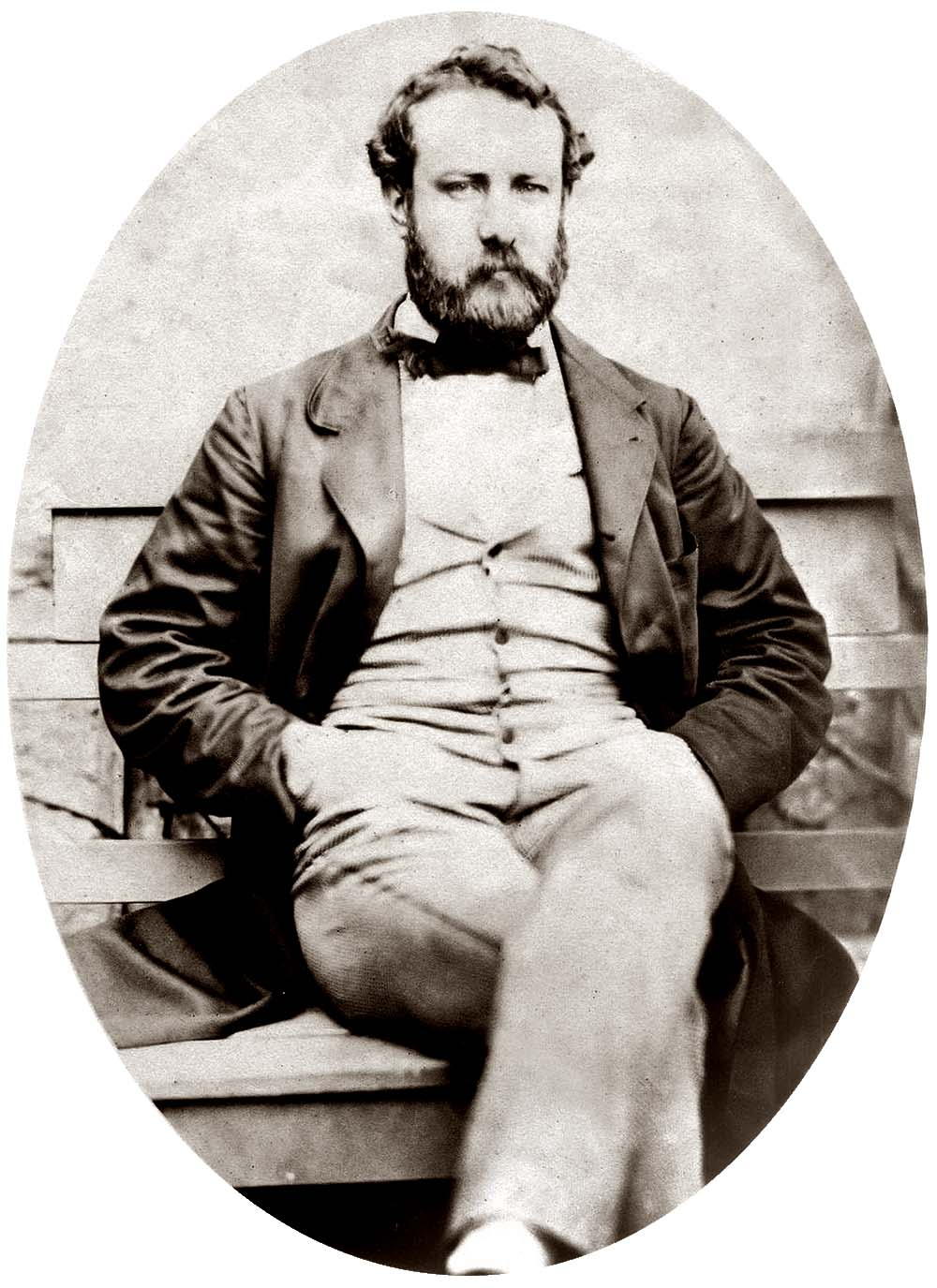
Jules Verne, circa 1856

Jules Verne (1828–1905) was a French novelist, poet, and playwright. Most famous for his novel sequence, the Voyages Extraordinaires, Verne also wrote assorted short stories, plays, miscellaneous novels, essays, and poetry. His works are notable for their profound influence on science fiction and on surrealism, their innovative use of modernist literary techniques such as self-reflexivity, and their complex combination of positivist and romantic ideologies.

Unless otherwise referenced, the information presented here is derived from the research of Volker Dehs, Jean-Michel Margot, Zvi Har’El, and William Butcher.

== Voyages Extraordinaires ==
Three publication dates for each book are given because, in the system developed by Pierre-Jules Hetzel for the Voyages Extraordinaires, each of Verne's novels was published successively in several different formats. This resulted in several distinct editions of each texts, as follows.

- Serial (known as éditions pré-originales, pre-original editions): Serialization in a periodical, usually Hetzel's own biweekly Magasin d'Éducation et de récréation ("Magazine of Education and Recreation", founded 1864). The serialized installments were illustrated by artists on Hetzel's staff, such as Édouard Riou, Léon Benett, and George Roux.
- In-18 (éditions originales, original editions): complete unillustrated texts published in book form at in-18 (18mo) size. (Similar versions in the slightly larger 12mo size, with illustrations taken from the serialization, are also considered éditions originales.) This edition is almost always the first book-format printing; the one exception is Claudius Bombarnac, which was first published in a grand-in-8º edition.
- In-8 (cartonnages dorés et colorés, gilded and colored bindings): Complete editions of the text, published in grand in-8º ("large octavo") book form with a lavishly decorated cover. These deluxe editions, designed for Christmas and New Year's markets, include most or all of the illustrations from the serializations.

=== Published in Verne's lifetime ===
Serial Year	French title	Year	English title	Year
—	Cinq Semaines en ballon	1863	Five Weeks in a Balloon	1865
1864–65	Voyages et aventures du capitaine Hatteras	1866	The Adventures of Captain Hatteras	1866
—	Voyage au centre de la Terre	1864	Journey to the Center of the Earth	1867
1865	De la Terre à la Lune	1865	From the Earth to the Moon	1868
1865–67	Les Enfants du capitaine Grant	1867–68	In Search of the Castaways	1868
1869–70	Vingt Mille Lieues sous les mers	1869–70	Twenty Thousand Leagues Under the Seas	1871
1869	Autour de la Lune	1870	Around the Moon	1872
1870	Une Ville flottante	1871	A Floating City	1871
1871–72	Aventures de trois Russes et de trois Anglais	1872	The Adventures of Three Englishmen and Three Russians in South Africa	1872
1872–73	Le Pays des fourrures	1873	The Fur Country	1873
1872	Le Tour du monde en quatre-vingts jours	1873	Around the World in Eighty Days	1873
1874–75	L'Île mystérieuse	1874–75	The Mysterious Island	1875
1874–75	Le Chancellor	1875	The Survivors of the Chancellor	1875
1876	Michel Strogoff	1876	Michael Strogoff	1876
1877	Hector Servadac	1877	Off on a Comet	1877
1877	Les Indes noires	1877	The Child of the Cavern	1877
1878	Un Capitaine de quinze ans	1878	Dick Sand, A Captain at Fifteen	1878
1879	Les Cinq Cents Millions de la Bégum	1879	The Begum's Fortune	1879
1879	Les Tribulations d'un Chinois en Chine	1879	Tribulations of a Chinaman in China	1879
1879–80	La Maison à vapeur	1880	The Steam House	1880
1881	La Jangada	1881	The Giant Raft	1881
1882	L'École des Robinsons	1882	Godfrey Morgan	1882
1882	Le Rayon vert	1882	The Green Ray	1882
1883	Kéraban-le-têtu	1883	Kéraban the Inflexible	1883
1884	L'Étoile du sud	1884	The Vanished Diamond	1884
1884	L'Archipel en feu	1884	The Archipelago on Fire	1884
1885	Mathias Sandorf	1885	Mathias Sandorf	1885
1886	Un Billet de loterie	1886	The Lottery Ticket	1886
1886	Robur-le-Conquérant	1886	Robur the Conqueror aka The Clipper of the Clouds	1886
1887	Nord contre Sud	1887	North Against South	1887
1887	Le Chemin de France	1887	The Flight to France	1887
1888	Deux Ans de vacances	1888	Two Years' Vacation	1888
1889	Famille-sans-nom	1889	Family Without a Name	1889
—	Sans dessus dessous	1889	The Purchase of the North Pole	1889
1890	César Cascabel	1890	César Cascabel	1890
1891	Mistress Branican	1891	Mistress Branican	1891
1892	Le Château des Carpathes	1892	Carpathian Castle	1892
1892	Claudius Bombarnac	1893	Claudius Bombarnac	1892
1893	P'tit-Bonhomme	1893	Foundling Mick	1893
1894	Mirifiques Aventures de Maître Antifer	1894	Captain Antifer	1894
1895	L'Île à hélice	1895	Propeller Island	1895
1896	Face au drapeau	1896	Facing the Flag	1896
1896	Clovis Dardentor	1896	Clovis Dardentor	1896
1897	Le Sphinx des glaces	1897	An Antarctic Mystery	1897
1898	Le Superbe Orénoque	1898	The Mighty Orinoco	1898
1899	Le Testament d'un excentrique	1899	The Will of an Eccentric	1899
1900	Seconde Patrie	1900	The Castaways of the Flag	1900
1901	Le Village aérien	1901	The Village in the Treetops	1901
1901	Les Histoires de Jean-Marie Cabidoulin	1901	The Sea Serpent	1901
1902	Les Frères Kip	1902	The Kip Brothers	1902
1903	Bourses de voyage	1903	Travel Scholarships	1903
1904	Un Drame en Livonie	1904	A Drama in Livonia	1904
1904	Maître du monde	1904	Master of the World	1904
1905	L'Invasion de la mer	1905	Invasion of the Sea	1905

=== Posthumous additions ===
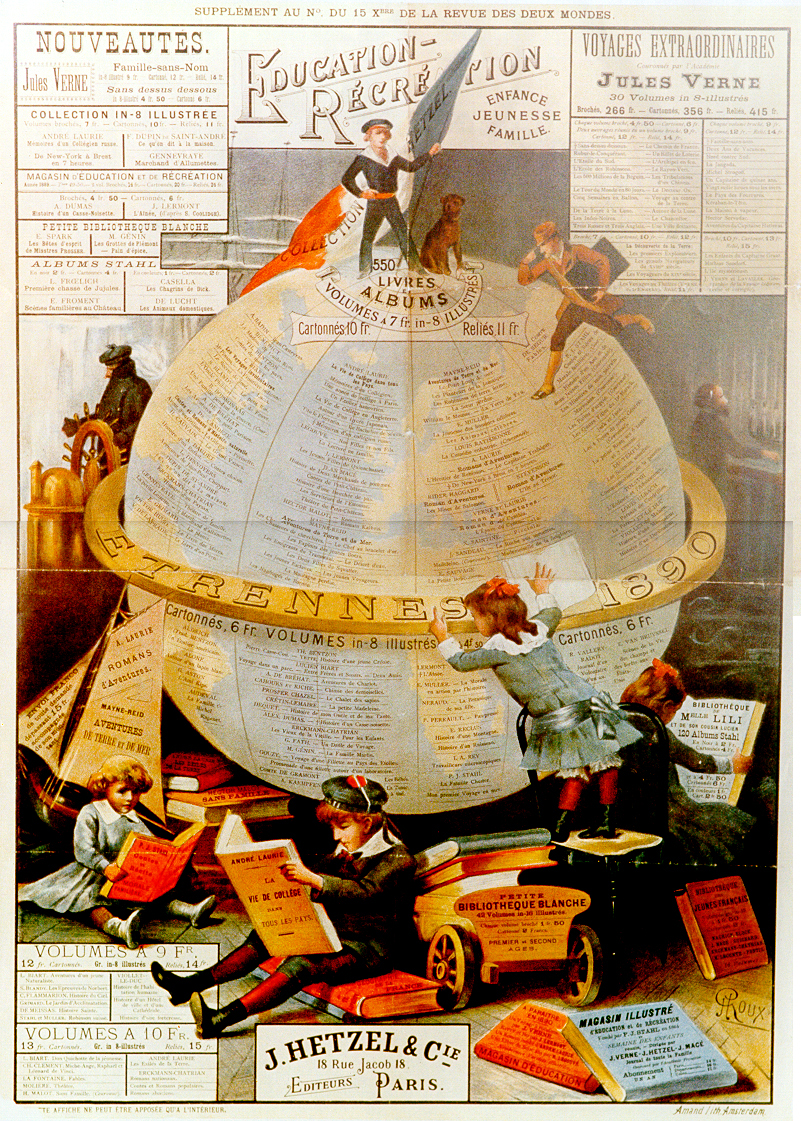
1890 Hetzel advertisement

The posthumously published volumes in the Voyages Extraordinaires were extensively altered, and in some cases entirely written, by Verne's son Michel. The original versions of the novels were published later by the Jules Verne Society in 1985 and 1999 with their original titles.

Original Manuscript publication Year	Original French title	Year	English title	Year Edited and Altered
1999	Le Phare du bout du monde	1905	The Lighthouse at the End of the World	1905
1989	Le Volcan d’or	1906	The Golden Volcano	1906
1986	La Chasse au météore	1908	The Chase of the Golden Meteor	1908
1988	Le Beau Danube Jaune	1908	The Danube Pilot (The Beautiful Yellow Danube)	1908
1985 (Limited) 1987	En Magellanie	2002	The Survivors of the "Jonathan"	1909
1999 *	Le Secret de Wilhelm Storitz	2011	The Secret of Wilhelm Storitz	1910
1991	Voyage d'études (unfinished)	1920	The Barsac Mission	1919

- This book was (in Czech translation) in library in Prague (Czech Republic now, Czechoslovakia then) between years 1990-1993, therefore original French edition must have happened before that time. Therefore the date should be checked.

== Other novels ==
=== Published in Verne's lifetime ===
- L'Épave du "Cynthia" (The Wreck of the "Cynthia", 1885, with André Laurie)

=== Posthumously published ===
- Jédédias Jamet or the story of a succession (1847) - unfinished (published in 1993)
- Un prêtre en 1839 (A Priest in 1839, 1845-1848, first published 1992, unfinished)
- Voyage en Angleterre et en Ecosse (Backwards to Britain, 1860, first published 1989)
- Joyeuses Misères de trois voyageurs en Scandinavie (The Joyous Miseries of 3 Travellers in Scandinavia) (1861) - unfinished, published in 2003
- Paris au XXe siècle (Paris in the Twentieth Century, 1863, first published 1994)
- L'Oncle Robinson (Uncle Robinson (c.1869-70) - draft for The Mysterious Island published in 1991 by Cherche-Midi Éditeur

== Short stories ==
=== Published in Verne's lifetime ===
- "Un drame au Mexique" ("A Drama in Mexico," originally published as "Les premiers navires de la marine mexicaine," 1851)
- "Un drame dans les airs" ("A Drama in the Air," originally published as "Un voyage en ballon," 1851)
- "Martin Paz" ("Martin Paz," 1852)
- "Maître Zacharius" ("Master Zacharius," 1854)
- "Un hivernage dans les glaces" ("A Winter Amid the Ice," 1855)
- "Le Comte de Chanteleine" ("The Count of Chanteleine", 1864)
- "Les Forceurs de blocus" ("The Blockade Runners", 1871)
- "Une fantaisie du Docteur Ox" ("Dr. Ox's Experiment," 1872)
- "Une ville idéale" ("An Ideal Town," 1875)
- "Les révoltés de la Bounty ("The Mutineers of the Bounty," 1879, with Gabriel Marcel)
- "Dix heures en chasse" ("Ten Hours Hunting," 1881)
- "Frritt-Flacc" ("Frritt-Flacc," 1884)
- "Gil Braltar" ("Gil Braltar," 1887)
- "La Journée d’un journaliste américain en 2890" (1891, based on the 1889 short story "In the Year 2889" by Michel Verne)
- "Aventures de la famille Raton" ("Adventures of the Rat Family," 1891)
- "Monsieur Ré-Dièze et Mademoiselle Mi-Bémol" ("Mr. Re Sharp and Miss Mi Flat," 1893)

=== Posthumously published ===
- "Pierre-Jean" (c. 1852) published in 1988 (La Manufacture)
- "Le Mariage de M. Anselme des Tilleuls" ("The Marriage of Mr. Anselme des Tilleuls," c. 1855) published in 1982.
- "Le Siège de Rome" ("The Siege of Rome," c.1854) published in 1993
- "San Carlos" (c. 1856) published in 1993
- "Le Humbug" ("The Humbug", c. 1870) published in 1985
- "Edom" ("Edom") published by Michel Verne in heavily altered form as L'Éternel Adam ("The Eternal Adam") in 1910; original version (by Jules Verne alone) published in 1991

== Nonfiction books ==
- Géographie illustrée de la France et de ses colonies (Illustrated Geography of France and its Colonies, 1866–68, with Théophile Lavallée)
- Découverte de la Terre: Histoire générale des grands voyages et des grands voyageurs (Discovery of the Earth, 1870–80, with Gabriel Marcel)
- Grands Navigateurs du XVIIIe siècle (Great Navigators of the Eighteenth Century)
- Les voyageurs du XIXe siècle

== Essays ==
- "Portraits d'artistes. XVIII" ("Portraits of Artists: XVIII," 1857)
- "Salon de 1857" ("Salon of 1857," series of seven articles, 1857)
- "A propos du Géant" ("About the Géant," 1863)
- "Edgar Poe et ses œuvres" ("Edgar Allan Poe and his Works," 1864)
- "Les méridiens et le calendrier" ("The Meridians and the Calendar," 1873)
- "24 minutes en ballon" ("24 Minutes in a Balloon," 1873)
- "Note pour l’affaire J. Verne contre Pont Jest" ("Note for the case J. Verne v. Pont Jest", 1876)
- "Souvenirs d’enfance et de jeunesse" ("Memories of Childhood and Youth," 1890)

== Plays ==
- Les Pailles rompues (The Broken Straws, 1850)
- Monna Lisa (Mona Lisa, 1852)
- Le Colin-Maillard (Blind Man's Buff, 1853, with Michel Carré and Aristide Hignard)
- Un Fils adoptif (The Adoptive Son, 1853, with Charles Wallut)
- Les Compagnons de la Marjolaine (Knights of the Daffodil, 1855, with Carré and Hignard)
- Monsieur de Chimpanzé (Mr. Chimpanzee, 1858, with Carré and Hignard)
- L’Auberge des Ardennes (The Inn in the Ardennes, 1860, with Carré and Hignard)
- Onze jours de siège (Eleven Days' Siege, 1861, with Wallut and Victorien Sardou)
- Un neveu d’Amérique (A Nephew from America, 1873, with Wallut and Édouard Cadol)
- Le Tour du monde en 80 jours (Around the World in 80 Days, 1874, with Adolphe d'Ennery)
- Les Enfants du capitaine Grant (The Children of Captain Grant, 1878, with d'Ennery)
- Michel Strogoff (Michael Strogoff, 1880, with d'Ennery)
- Voyage à travers l'impossible (Journey Through the Impossible, 1882)
- Kéraban-le-têtu (Kéraban the Pigheaded, 1883)
- Mathias Sandorf (Mathias Sandorf, 1887, with William Busnach)
