= Henry Frith =

Irish author and translator (1840–1917)

- Born: 2 May 1840; Dublin, Ireland
- Died: 12 October 1917 (aged 77); Amersham, Buckinghamshire, England
- Occupations: Engineer; translator; writer; editor; civil servant
- Years active: 1875–1913
- Notable work: Translations of Jules Verne

Henry Frith (2 May 1840 – 12 October 1917) was an Irish engineer and writer who translated the works of Jules Verne and others and also wrote original works. His prolific output included nearly 200 works, comprising translations, novels, and instructional titles.

== Early life ==
Frith was born in Dublin, Ireland, on 2 May 1840, at 2 Upper Leeson Street. He was the second son of Henry Frith and Frances (née Winter). Of his four siblings, only two, his eldest and youngest brothers, survived to adulthood. His father worked in the Dublin Ordnance Office. Frith was educated at Cheltenham College and entered Trinity College Dublin on 1 July 1857 to train as a Civil Engineer. After applying for a Civil Service post, he was appointed to the War Office in London, where he remained until 1875 when he retired with a pension and began his literary efforts.

Frith married Mary Lowndes (April 1844 – 7 June 1928) on 25 May 1869 in Hove, Sussex, England. Mary was the third daughter of William Lowndes (1807–1864) and Marth Sutton (1807–1890). The Lowndes were a wealthy family, being the ground landlords for Knightsbridge in London. When Mary's step-brother, William Lowndes, (1834–1905) died, his estate was valued at £452,310. He left £7,000 to each of his three half sisters, as well as his real estate (the Knightsbridge ground rents, and the Bury house) together with the residue of his personal estate to Mary's eldest son, William Frederick.

The couple had six children:

- Ida Mary Frith (1870–1963)
- William Frederick Lowndes Frith (1871–1956), who changed his surname from Frith to Frith Lowndes in 1906. This was at the request of his step-uncle William Lowndes, in his will, which made William his heir.
- Ernest Henry Frith (1874–1926)
- Lilian Adela Frith (1880–1962)
- Roland Girdlestone Frith (1884–1947), moved to the US
- Percival Lowndes Frith (1886–1954)

== Works ==
Frith originally trained as an engineer and worked for the War Office until 1875, when he qualified for a pension. The way in which he described himself changed over time:

- 1870 Baptismal record: Gentleman
- 1871 Census: Civil Servant – War Office
- 1871 Baptismal record: Gentleman
- 1874 Baptismal record: Manager to a Public Company
- 1881 Census: Author, Editor, Publisher's Reader
- 1884 Baptismal record: Author
- 1886 Baptismal record: Authorship
- 1891 Census: Literature
- 1896 Marriage Record for Frederick: Author
- 1901 Census: Retired Author
- 1908 Marriage record for Ida: Gentleman
- 1911 Census: Retired Civil Servant – War Office

Frith's work, with nearly 200 books to his credit, consists of:

- Translations, from French, of novels and instructional works.
- Novels, mostly juvenile fiction.
- Entertaining non-fiction, usually for younger readers.
- Instructional non-fiction.

He also produced some albums and books that do not fit easily into these four categories. Frith freely made use of other people's works in his non-fiction writing, some of them being encyclopedic in tone, briefly covering a wide range of issues related to a topic. In his preface to Ascents and Adventures: A Record of Hardy Mountaineering in Every Quarter of the Globe, he writes: "The following pages do not profess to be a record of our own personal adventures. They include many experiences of a varied character in Europe, Asia, and America; but while making use of the narratives and notes of more experienced climbers, without copying their work, we have in some cases embodied the spirit of it, and fixed it in our pages for the amusement, and it may be for the instruction, of young people."

=== Translations ===
The earliest of Frith's works catalogued by the British Library is an 1875 translation of Les Braves Gens by Jules Girardin. The English translation was titled "The Adventures of Johnny Ironsides" . Frith followed this in 1876 with a translation of two of Jules Verne's stories: Une Ville flottante and Les Forceurs de blocus, as A Floating City and the The Blockade Runners.

Frith translated another five works by Verne:

- 1876: Vingt mille lieues sur les mers as Twenty Thousand Leagues Under the Seas.
- 1877: Aventures de trois Russes et de trois Anglais as Adventures of Three Englishmen and Three Russians in Southern Africa
- 1878: Le Tour du monde en quatre-vingts jours as Around the World in Eighty Days
- 1879: Le Pays des fourrures as The Fur Country
- 1884: Kéraban-le-têtu as Kéraban the Inflexible

The Encyclopedia of Science Fiction suggests that Frith may have translated Verne's Five Weeks in a Balloon, but neither Wolcott nor Evans include it in their lists.

Wolcott rated Frith's translation of Vingt mille lieues sur les mers as a translation of particular merit, and said of him: "With his scientific background, he understood much of what Verne had written, and this translation has remained one of the best of the time with only minor deletions from the original text."

Frith also translated other works by:

- Lucien Biart
- Joséphine-Blanche Colomb
- Alphonse Daudet
- Alexandre Dumas
- Léon Gautier
- Jules Girardin
- Adrien Paul
- Philippe Daryl
- Gaston Tissandier
- Victor Tissot
- P. Villars

=== Novels ===
Most of Frith's novels belong to the boys' adventure category. The list of titles is not meant to be comprehensive, but to show to the reader the range of Frith's output. The titles include:

- Aboard the Atlanta: The Story of a Truant
- The Captain of Cadets
- A Cruise in Cloudland
- In the Yellow Sea: A Tale of the Japanese War
- The Lost Trader: or, the mystery of the “Lombardy,” etc.
- The Hunting of the “Hydra,” or the Phantom Prahu

=== Entertaining non-fiction ===
Frith's entertaining non-fiction works were primarily intended for younger readers. The titles include:

- The Biography of a Locomotive Engineer
- The Romance of Engineering
- The Romance of Navigation
- Coil and Current
- Half Hours of Scientific Amusement (translated from a book by Gaston Tissandier)
- Ascents and Adventures
- Haunted Ancestral Homes: True Ghost Stories
- Chivalry (translated from a book by Léon Gautier)
- King Arthur and His Knights

=== Instructional non-fiction ===
Frith's instructional non-fiction has been quite long-lived, with new editions, sometimes revised, long after his death. The titles include:

- Speeches and Toasts: how to make and propose them
- The Chairman's Guide and Secretary's Companion
- The Complete Letter-Writer for Ladies and Gentlemen
- Chiromancy: or the science of palmistry
- How to read Character in Handwriting

== Death ==
Frith died on 12 October 1917, aged 77. He was still living at Shenstone House, Amersham Common. He was survived by his wife Mary, who administered his estate of £2,335. The Buckinghamshire Examiner expressed sympathy for his son, William Frederick. Mary survived Frith by nearly 11 years and died on 7 June 1928.
