= Pierre Michel François Chevalier =

French author, historian and journalist (1812-1863)

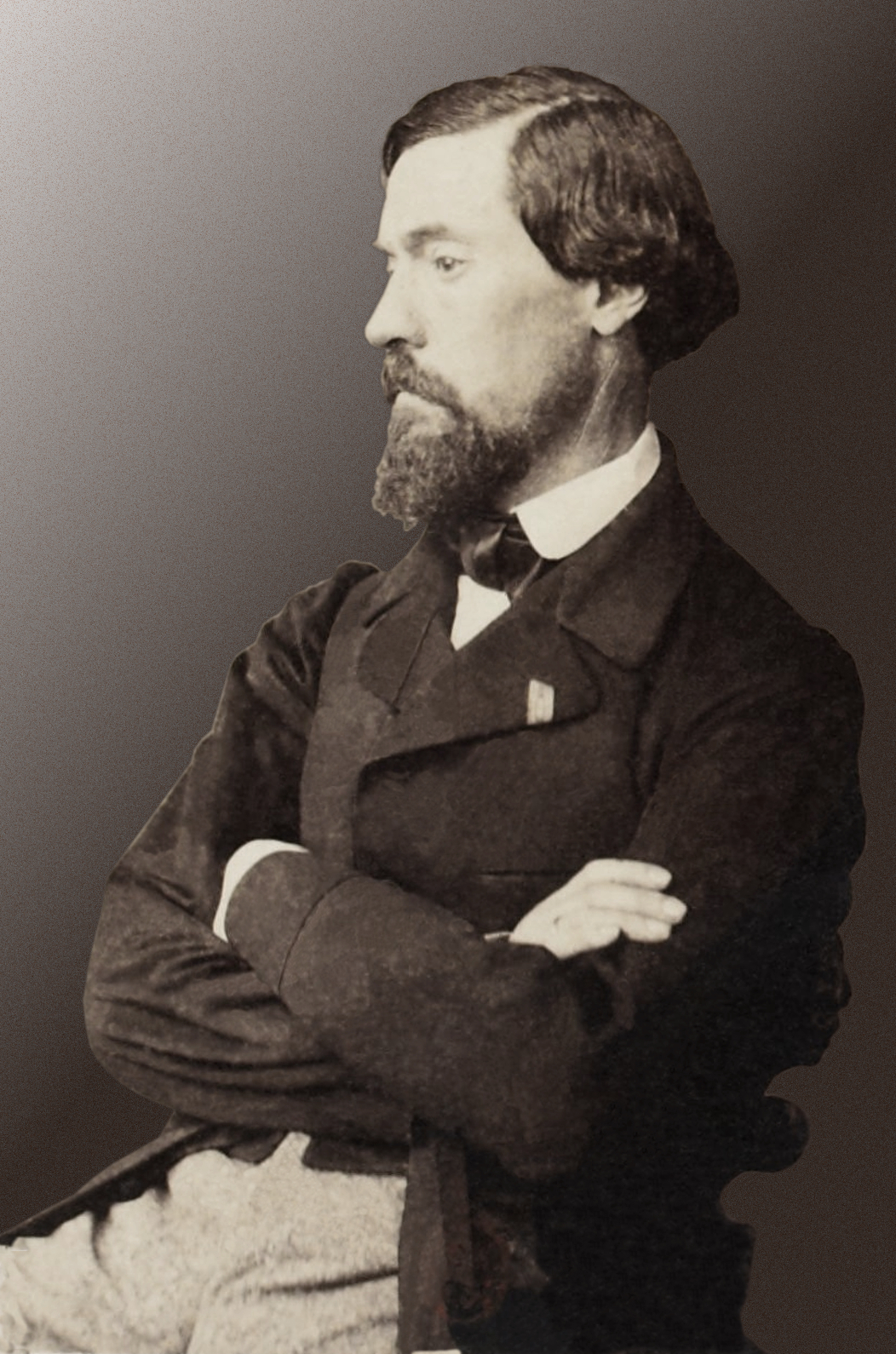
- photo portrait (1861) by Hippolyte Bayard
- Born: 16 November 1812; Paimbœuf, Lower Loire, France
- Died: 15 June 1863 (aged 50); Paris, France
- Other name: Pitre-Chevalier
- Occupations: Writer, historian, journalist
- Known for: editor of Le Figaro, Director of Musée des Familles
- Spouse: Camille Decan de Chatouville (m. 1835)
- Children: Marguerite Pitre-Chevalier

Pierre-Michel-François Chevalier, known as Pitre-Chevalier, (16 November 1812 – 15 June 1863) was a French writer, historian and journalist. He was an editor of Le Figaro and Director of the Museum of Families (Musée des familles).

== Relationship with Jules Verne ==
In 1851, Jules Verne met with Pitre-Chevalier, a fellow writer from Nantes and the editor-in-chief of the magazine Musée des familles (The Family Museum). Pitre-Chevalier was looking for articles about geography, history, science, and technology, and was keen to make sure that the educational component would be made accessible to large popular audiences using a straightforward prose style or an engaging fictional story. Verne, with his delight in diligent research, especially in geography, was a natural for the job. Verne first offered him a short historical adventure story, "The First Ships of the Mexican Navy," written in the style of James Fenimore Cooper, whose novels had deeply influenced him. Pitre-Chevalier published it, and in the same year also accepted a second short story, "A Voyage in a Balloon". The latter story, with its combination of adventurous narrative, travel themes, and detailed historical research, would later be described by Verne as "the first indication of the line of novel that I was destined to follow." While writing stories and articles for Pitre-Chevalier, Verne began to form the idea of inventing a new kind of novel, a Roman de la Science (novel of science), which would allow him to incorporate large amounts of the factual information he so enjoyed researching in the Bibliothèque. They wrote the comedy Chateaux en Californie together in 1852.

Verne's work for the magazine was cut short in 1856, when he had a serious quarrel with Pitre-Chevalier and refused to continue contributing (a refusal he would maintain until 1863, when Pitre-Chevalier died and the magazine went to new editorship).

== Personal life ==
He married Camille Decan de Chatouville in 1835 in Paris. They had a daughter, Marguerite Pitre-Chevalier.

== Tributes ==
- Nantes, Quimper and Paimbœuf each have a street that bears the name of Pitre-Chevalier, and a boulevard of Villers-sur-mer. Pitre-Chevalier is mentioned in a poem by Theodore funambulesques Odes Blanville, only to find his "prodigious fecundity". A commemorative plaque was affixed to 37bis rue d'Artois in Paris apartment building died Pierre-Michel-François Chevalier.

== Bibliography ==
=== Historical writings ===
- Jeanne de Montfort (war time in 1342), the reign of Philip de Valois. (W. Coquebert, 1840)
- Ancient and Modern Britain (W. Coquebert, 1844)
- La Bretagne ancienne et moderne (1845) illustrated by Tony Johannot
- Brittany and Vendée. History of the French Revolution in the West (W. Coquebert, 1845-1848)
- Nantes and the Lower Loire: ancient and modern monuments, sites & picturesque costumes in collaboration with Émile Souvestre (Charpentier Father, Son and Co. Nantes, 1850.)
- History of the Vendée Wars including the history of the Revolution in Brittany, Anjou, Poitou, Maine and Normandy (Paris: Didier, 1851)
- The revolutions of the past; Chronicles of the Fronde, 1648-1652 (V. Lecou 1852)
- Queens are going ... (Museum of families, 1853)
- Costumes and church ornaments (Museum of families, 1857)
- The preachers of our time. Father Lavigne (Nice: impr Subwoofer, 1862)

=== Booklets ===
- Air Velléda final, opera in two acts. (No date)
- Duo Cynodocée opera in five acts. (No date)

=== Novels ===
- Rosita. Souvenir d'Espagne. (serialized in Le Commerce, 1839)
- Brown and Blonde. (W. Coquebert 1841)
- Door to Door. (De Vigny, 1843)
- The one I love. (The book serials, 1843)
- A ghost story. (The book serials, 1843)
- The wrong party. (De Vigny, 1843)

== Sources ==
- Evans, Arthur B. (1988), Jules Verne rediscovered: didacticism and the scientific novel, New York: Greenwood Press
- Lottmann, Herbert R. (1996), Jules Verne: an exploratory biography, New York: St. Martin's Press
- Sherard, Robert H. (January 1894), "Jules Verne at Home", McClure's Magazine, archived from the original on 29 August 2000
