= Martin Paz =

- Short story by Jules Verne
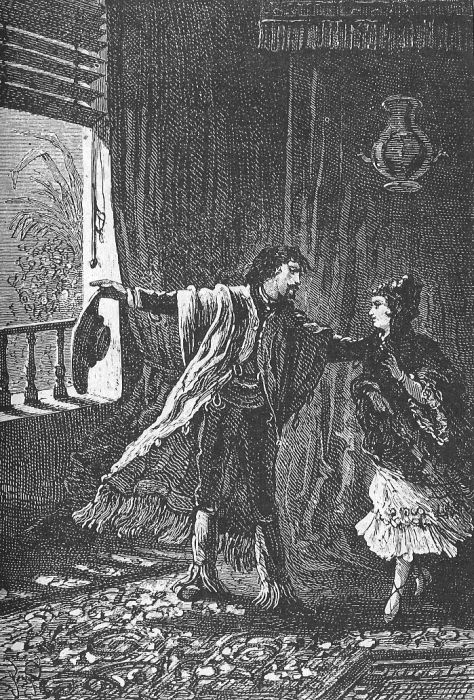
- Martin Paz and Sarah, illustrated in 1875 by Jules Férat
- Country: France

Publication
- Publisher: Pierre-Jules Hetzel
- Publication date: 1852

"Martin Paz" is a long short story (novella) by Jules Verne, written in 1851. It appeared in the Musée des familles from July 10 through August 11, 1852. The text was later revised and enlarged for publication in book form.

== Plot ==
The story is set in Lima, Peru. Verne begins with a description of Peruvian painter Ignacio Merino's life and art; Verne credits Merino's engravings as inspiring him to write fiction about the country.

A Jewish businessman named Samuel has promised to give his daughter Sarah as a wife to the rich mestizo, André Certa. But Sarah - who is very attracted to the Catholic religion - is in love with the young Indian chief Martin Paz. Following a knife fight at Samuel's house, in which Certa is hurt, Paz has to flee. He jumps in a raging river and everyone believes him dead, but he finds refuge with the Spanish nobleman Don Végal who takes a liking to him and places him under his protection. Later, Paz secretly encounters Certa with Samuel and, listening in on their conversation, he learns that Sarah is not Samuel's daughter but, rather, the daughter of a Spanish nobleman that Samuel rescued following a shipwreck.

Before the wedding can take place, an Indian rebellion begins. The rebels attack Samuel's home, killing him, and Paz is able to escape with Sarah to Végal's house. Once there, Végal discovers that Sarah is his daughter, who he thought was dead. Certa attempts to get his revenge. Paz and Végal get away, but the Indians kidnap Sarah. Végal and Paz set off in pursuit, and discover that the Indians have condemned Sarah to death for taking Paz away from his tribal duties. She is to be executed by going over a waterfall while tied to a canoe. Paz arrives just in time, but he is unable to save her and they die together.

== Themes ==
Among the subjects covered are anti-Semitism (see also: Off on a Comet), the struggle for independence, miscegenation and the role of aristocracy in public affairs.

== English edition ==
- Survivors of the Chancellor and Martin Paz, James R. Osgood, Boston, 1876. Translated by Ellen Frewer. Text @ Google Books
- Martin Paz @ Project Gutenberg
