= Artist and the Author =

Artist and the Author is a pamphlet written by George Cruikshank in 1872. During the late 1860s, Cruikshank claimed to be the author of works attributed to other writers, including Charles Dickens and William Harrison Ainsworth. After John Forster contradicted Cruikshank's claims to having "originated" Oliver Twist, Cruikshank began a dispute in The Times as being the creator of novels attributed to Ainsworth. After the newspaper stopped carrying the dispute, Cruikshank produced all of his claims in Artist and the Author, where he disputed his relationship to 8 of Ainsworth's novels.

== Background ==
Cruikshank's claims surrounding the works of Dickens and Ainsworth stem from his early involvement with Ainsworth as illustrator for various works by Ainsworth that were published in The Bentley's Miscellany and the Ainsworth's Magazine. Although Tony Johannot was first used to illustrate Ainsworth's first work in the Ainsworth's Magazine, Windsor Castle, Cruikshank became the dominant illustrator and replaced him in the role for the majority of the novel. Once Cruikshank joined with Ainsworth, Cruikshank moved his efforts from his own magazine, The Omnibus, to the Ainsworth's Magazine and focused completely on the magazine.

The two worked closely together on many projects while Cruikshank would provide illustrations for other authors, including Dickens, for whom Cruikshank illustrated two works, Sketches by Boz and Oliver Twist. It was Ainsworth who introduced Cruikshank to Dickens, and Cruikshank began providing illustrations for both Oliver Twist and Ainsworth's Jack Sheppard, which ran in serial during the same time in 1839. Immediately following the serial publications of Oliver Twist and Jack Sheppard, there were unlicensed theatre productions of the works. Of these, Ainsworth and Cruikshank, with Cruikshank going so far as to advise one of the set designers, was in favour of while Dickens was not. In an 8 October 1839 letter to G. B. Davidge in praise of one of the productions, Ainsworth wrote, "The fact of the whole of the Scenery having been superintended by Mr. George Cruikshank, must be a sufficient guarantee to the Public for its excellence and accuracy."

The relationship between Ainsworth and Cruikshank continued until Saint James's, the final novel that the two worked together on. It is possible that it resulted from Ainsworth selling his magazine or that Ainsworth drifted from Cruikshank after not needing an illustrator for some time. Of the relationship between author and illustrator, the Athenaeum printed a review which claimed that it was "doubtful whether the plates were etched for the book, or the book written to illustrate the plates" but stated such with a negative purpose. This was followed by those like William Makepeace Thackeray that complimented the power of Cruikshank's illustrations on the story: "With regard to the modern romance of 'Jack Sheppard' [...] it seems to us that Mr. Cruikshank really created the tale, and that Mr. Ainsworth, as it were, only put words to it."

Decades later, Cruikshank began publishing claims that he was the one responsible for many of Ainsworth's novels, and it is possible that the reviews about the power of his illustrations encouraged him towards this belief. However, years before he claimed to be the "originator" of Dickens's Oliver Twist and this account was recorded by Shelton Mackenzi in an article published in the United States. This article was refuted by Forster in his Life of Charles Dickens (1871).

== Claim ==
Forster's dismissal of Cruikshank's claim did not dissuade Cruikshank from pursuing the matter further. To the contrary, he began to add to the claim that he was the originator of Ainsworth's books in addition to Oliver Twist. These claims were limited until a theatrical version of The Miser's Daughter, called Hilda, was produced in April 1872 for the Adelphi Theatre by Andrew Halliday. This prompted Cruikshank, on 6 April 1872, to write a letter to The Times about the theatrical production. The letter was published and stated:

it is stated that Mr. W. Harrison Ainsworth's novel of The Miser's Daughter had been dramatised by Mr. Andrew Halliday, and produced at the Adelphi Theatre, and as my name is not mentioned in any way in connection with the novel—not even as the illustrator—I shall feel greatly obliged if you allow me to inform the public through the medium of your columns of the fact (which all my private friends are aware of) that this tale of The Miser's Daughter originated from me, and not from Mr. Ainsworth.

My idea suggested to that gentleman was to write a story in which the principal character should be a miser, who had a daughter, and that the struggles of feeling between the love for his child and his love of money, should produce certain effects and results; and as all my ancestors were mixed up in the Rebellion of '45, I suggested that the story should be of that date, in order that I might introduce some scenes and circumstances connected with that great party struggle, and also wishing to let the public of the present day have a peep at the places of public amusement of the period, I took considerable pains to give correct views and descriptions of those places which are now copied and produced upon the stage; and I take this opportunity of complimenting my friend Halliday for the very excellent and effective manner in which he has dramatised the story.

I do not mean to say that Mr. Ainsworth, when writing this novel, did not introduce some of his own ideas; but as the first idea and all the principal points and characters emanated from me, I think it will be allowed that the title of originator of The Miser's Daughter should be conferred upon, Sir, Your obedient servant, George Cruikshank.

Ainsworth, in a letter to The Times, responded: "In a letter from Mr. George Cruikshank which appears in The Times of to-day, that distinguished artist claims to be the originator of The Miser's Daughter. I content myself with giving the statement a positive contradiction. Mr. Cruikshank appears to labour under a singular delusion in regard to the novels he has illustrated, it is not long since he claimed to be the originator of Mr. Dickens's Oliver Twist."

Cruikshank quickly responded, on 10 April 1872, and claimed even more of Ainsworth's novels as being his own:

I have to beg that you will permit me to express my regret that his memory should be in such a defective state, that he should have forgotten the circumstances and facts as to the origins of Oliver Twist, and of The Miser's Daughter; and I regret also this contradiction of his will compel me, in justice to myself, to give in a work I am preparing for the press a full, true, and particular account of all the professional transactions between Mr. Ainsworth and myself, in which I shall prove, beyond all fear of contradiction, that I am also the sole originator of what is called 'Ainsworth's Tower of London,' as well as another work bearing his name, but the ideas and suggestions of what were given to him by, Sir, your obedient servant, George Cruikshank.

To this expanded claim, Ainsworth simply responded on 11 April 1872, "I disdain to reply to Mr. Cruikshank's preposterous assertions, except to give them, as before, a flat contradiction." The statement was the last printed in The Times as the Editor then declared that "We can publish no more letters on the subject".

== Pamphlet ==
While being unable to continue the dispute in The Times, Cruikshank published a pamphlet called The Artist and the Author- "Proving that the Distinguished Author, Mr. W. Harrison Ainsworth, is 'labouring under a singular delusion' with respect to the origin of The Miser's Daughter, The Tower of London, etc." The pamphlet says:

I am therefore compelled in self-defence, to place certain facts before the public, to prove beyond the fear of contradiction, that what I have asserted is the truth, and that it is Mr. Ainsworth who is labouring under a delusion, or has unfortunately lost his memory... ever since these works were published, and even when they were in progress, I have in private society, when conversing upon such matters, always explained that the original ideas and characters of these works emanated from me.

Cruikshank then points out that the 1 December 1871 The Illustrated Review (No. 28) listed 8 of Ainsworth's novels without mentioning him in any regard to them: Rookwood, Jack Sheppard, Guy Fawkes, The Tower of London, Old St. Paul's, The Miser's Daughter, Windsor Castle, and St. James's; or the Court of Queen Anne. Following this list, he writes:

Now, Six of these works were illustrated entirely by me, and one-Windsor Castle-partly so, numbering altogether ONE HUNDRED AND FORTY-FOUR of the very best designs and etchings which I have ever produced; and yet, in this Biographical Sketch, my name is not mentioned in any way as connected with these works-which omission, I thought, was not only very ungenerous, but also very unjust... And, when it was announced that Mr. Andrew Halliday had dramatized Ainsworth's 'Miser's Daughter,' I went to see the performance; and when I saw represented on the stage scenes and characters which had emanated from me, I then publicly claimed to be the originator of that romance, and to have suggested the original idea and characters to Mr. Ainsworth.

It is possible that Cruikshank felt outraged that Ainsworth would use another illustrator, John Franklin, for a novel that Cruikshank stated that he wanted to pursue. Cruikshank claims that the incident caused him to start the Omnibus. This incident occurred before their partnership with the Ainsworth's Magazine and Cruikshank was still illustrating other works for Ainsworth at the time. There is little evidence to suggest that Cruikshank's chronology of the events or his statements about the motivations behind his earlier actions is correct.

== Aftermath ==
Ainsworth responded to the matter for Blancard Jerrold's biography, Life of George Cruikshank. In his response, Ainsworth states,

I believe [Cruikshank] to be in his dotage, and was confirmed in the opinion when I found he laboured under a similar delusion in regard to Oliver Twist.

For myself, I desire to state emphatically, that not a single line—not a word—in any of my novels was written by their illustrator, Cruikshank. In no instance did he even see a proof. The subjects were arranged with him early in the month, and about the fifteenth he used to send me tracings of the plates. That was all [...]

Had Cruikshank been capable of constructing a story, why did he not exercise his talent when he had no connection with Mr. Dickens or myself? But I never heard of such a tale being published[...]

But overweening vanity formed a strong part of Cruikshank's character. He boasted so much of the assistance he had rendered authors, that at last he believed he had written their works. Had he been connected with Fielding, he would no doubt have asserted that he wrote a great portion of Tom Jones. Moreover, he was excessively troublesome and obtrusive in his suggestions. Mr. Dickens declared to me that he could not stand it, and should send him printed matter in future.

It would be unjust, however, to deny that there was wonderful cleverness and quickness about Cruikshank, and I am indebted to him for many valuable hints and suggestions.

However, as S. M. Ellis points out, "Cruikshank did not claim to have written any portion of the books in question, but to have 'originated' them. But the artist's claim of 'originator' was, in all conscience, so original that one is lost in wonder at the far-reaching possibilities of the new theory he so modestly enunciated."

Regardless, the claims by Cruikshank and Ainsworth's refutation only brought Cruikshank disfavour with the public. To society, as Ellis puts it, "the only possible explanation of the artist's extraordinary assertions is that he was a victim of senile delusions". Cruikshank's friend, William Powell Frith, believed that Cruikshank was under an "absurd delusion" in the matter. Another friend, Austin Dobsin, stated, "I certainly think Cruikshank was honestly deluded, but he was, no doubt a vain man" and "He was not exempt from a certain 'Roman infirmity' of exaggerating the importance of his own performances [...] It must also be conceded that he most signally seconded the text by his graphic interpretations; but that this aid or these suggestions were of such a nature as to transfer the credit [...] from authors to himself is more than can be reasonably allowed."
