= James Playfair =

James Playfair may refer to:

- James Playfair (architect) (1755–1794), Scottish architect
- James Playfair (minister) (1738–1819), Scottish clergyman
- James Playfair (businessman) (1860–1937), Canadian entrepreneur
- Jim Playfair (born 1964), Canadian ice hockey player
- James Playfair, a fictional character in the short story "The Blockade Runners" by Jules Verne
