= Clovis Dardentor =

1896 novel by Jules Verne

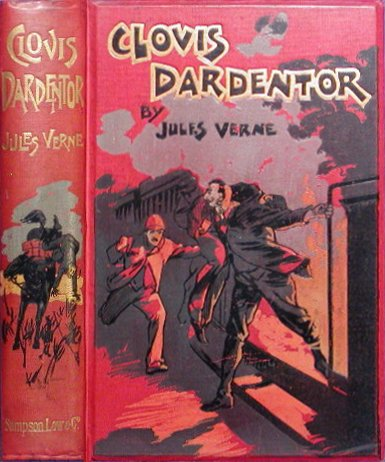
- Cover from UK Edition
- Author: Jules Verne
- Original title: Clovis Dardentor
- Illustrator: Léon Benett
- Language: French
- Series: The Extraordinary Voyages #43
- Genre: Adventure novel
- Publisher: Pierre-Jules Hetzel
- Publication date: 1896
- Publication place: France
- English publication date: 1897
- Media type: Print (Hardback)
- Preceded by: Facing the Flag
- Followed by: An Antarctic Mystery

Clovis Dardentor is an 1896 novel by French writer Jules Verne, written partly as a travel narrative. The original illustrations were drawn by designer Léon Benett. It is one of Verne's least-known works.

== Plot summary ==
Two cousins, Jean Taconnat and Marcel Lornans, travelling from Cette, France, to Oran, Algeria, with the purpose of enlisting in the 5th regiment of the Chasseurs D'Afrique.

Sailing to Oran aboard the Argelès, they meet Clovis Dardentor, a wealthy industrialist. Jean and Marcel, whose desire to travel to Africa arises from their pursuit of financial independence, find out that Clovis —an unmarried man, with no family— has left no heirs to his fortune.

Yet Marcel, well-versed in the Law, knows that any person who were to save Clovis' life either from a fight, from drowning, or from a fire, would be able to be adopted by Clovis. The cousins come to a plan: They will find a way to save Clovis' life, so that he will indeed be legally allowed to adopt them.

Clovis saves the cousins' lives: Marcel is saved from a fire, and Jean is saved from drowning.

Eventually, while Jean continues to look for the opportunity to save Clovis' life, Marcel falls in love with Louise Elissane, the prospective daughter-in-law of one of Clovis' acquaintances, the unpleasant Desirandelle family. Louise becomes a key character in the novel, for it is she who saves Clovis Dardentor's life.

In the end, Louise is adopted by Clovis, and marries Marcel.

== Style ==
Common throughout Clovis Dardentor is Verne's usage of a comedic, slightly burlesque tone in the narration and in the characters' dialogues (something which the narrator confirms at a certain point of the novel).

== Publication history ==
Clovis Dardentor was first published in France in 1896; and, in 1897, the first British edition, fully illustrated, was published by Sampson Low, Marston, and Company. The book was not published in the U.S. until 2008, when the Choptank Press of Saint Michaels, Maryland, re-published the Sampson Low version in a fully illustrated replica edition as a Lulu Press book.

== Film adaptation ==
In 2013, three British film-makers were in the development stages of Killing Clovis Dardentor, an adaptation of the book writren by Lizzie Hopley. Writer Lizzie Hopley had written the screenplay for the movie.
