= Jules Férat =

French artist and illustrator (1829–1906)

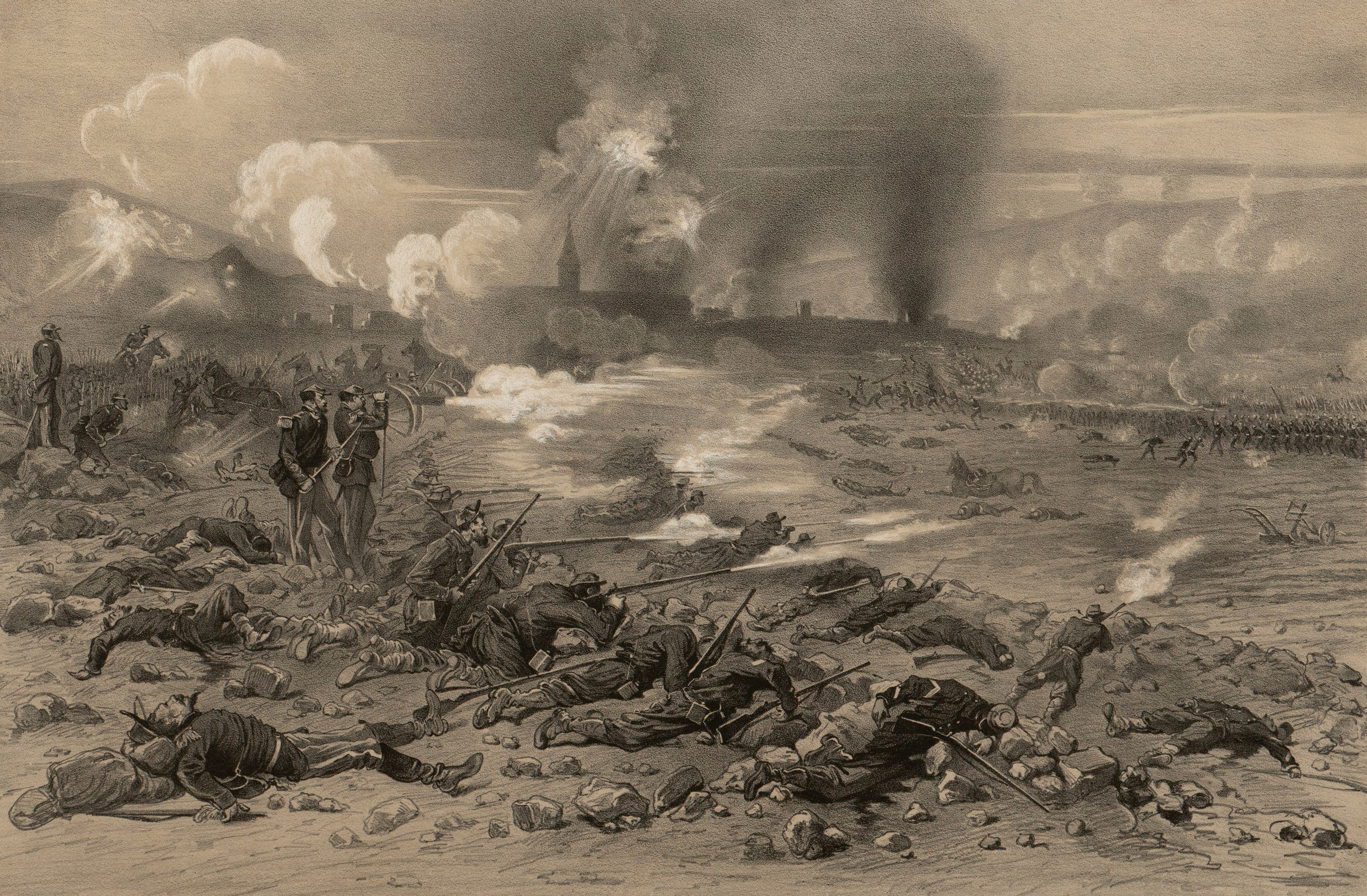
Engraving of Férat's drawing of the Battle of Forbach.

Jules-Descartes Férat (French: [ʒyl feʁa]; 28 November 1829 – 6 June 1906) was a French artist and illustrator, famous for his portrayals of factories and their workers. He illustrated the books of many known authors, such as Jules Verne, Edgar Allan Poe, Victor Hugo, and Émile Zola. He also contributed to the French illustrated press including the newspapers L'Illustration, Le Journal Illustré, and L'Univers Illustré.

== Books illustrated by Férat ==
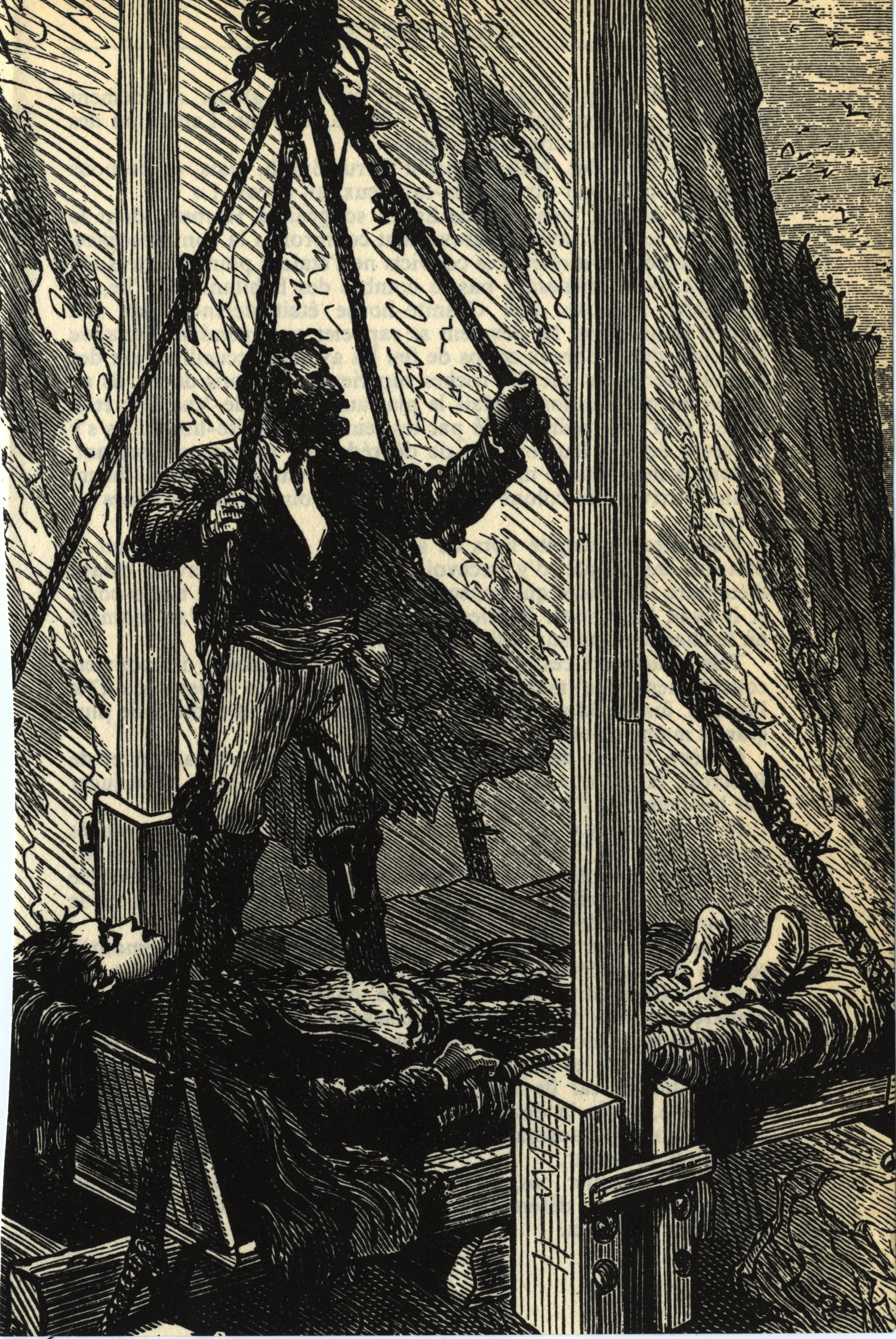
An illustration from The Mysterious Island.

=== Jules Verne ===
Novels

- (1871) A Floating City, 44 illustrations
- (1872) The Adventures of Three Englishmen and Three Russians in South Africa, 53 illustrations
- (1873) The Fur Country, 103 illustrations (with Alfred Quesnay de Beaurépaire)
- (1875) The Mysterious Island, 152 illustrations
- (1876) Michael Strogoff, 91 illustrations
- (1877) The Child of the Cavern, 45 illustrations

Short stories

- (1871) The Blockade Runners, 17 illustrations
- (1875) Martin Paz, 12 illustrations
- (1876) A Drama in Mexico, 6 illustrations
