= Mistress Branican =

1891 novel by Jules Verne

- Author: Jules Verne
- Original title: Mistress Branican
- Translator: A. Estoclet
- Illustrator: Léon Benett
- Language: French
- Series: The Extraordinary Voyages #36
- Genre: Adventure novel
- Publisher: Pierre-Jules Hetzel
- Publication date: 1891
- Publication place: France
- English publication date: 1891
- Media type: Print (Hardback)
- OCLC: 8333020
- Preceded by: César Cascabel
- Followed by: Carpathian Castle

Mistress Branican (French: Mistress Branican) is an 1891 adventure novel written by Jules Verne. It is based on Colonel Peter Egerton-Warburton's and Ernest Giles' accounts of their journeys across the deserts of Western Australia, and was also inspired by the search launched by Jane Franklin when her husband Sir John Franklin was reported lost in the Northwest Passage.

== Synopsis ==
The story begins in the United States, where the heroine, Mistress Branican, suffers a mental breakdown after the death by drowning of her young son. On recovering, she learns that her husband, Captain Branican, has been reported lost at sea. Having acquired a fortune, she is able to launch an expedition to search for her husband, who she is convinced is still alive. She leads the expedition herself and trail leads her into the Australian hinterland.

== Publication history ==
- 1895, United States, New York: Cassell Pub. Co. 377 pp., First US edition
- 1903, United States, New York: Street & Smith, 377 pp., published under title The Wreck of the Franklin
- 1970, Australia, Melbourne: Sun Books, 282 pp. Paperback edition
