= The Blockade Runners =

- Short story by Jules Verne
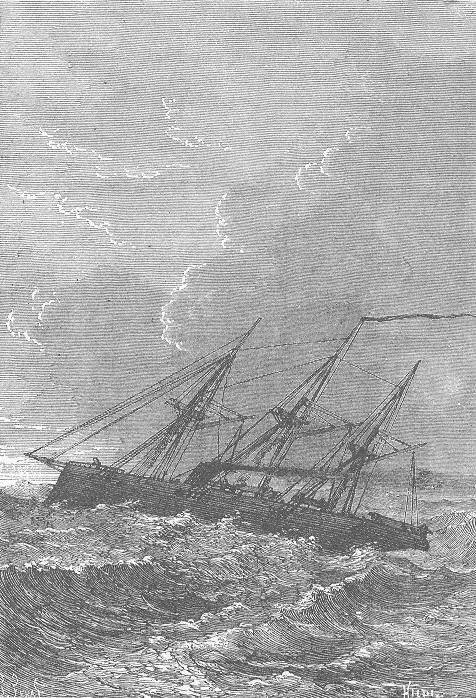
- The Delphin crossing the Atlantic. Illustration by Jules Férat
- Original title: Les Forceurs de blocus
- Country: France
- Language: French
- Genres: Historical, short story, adventure novel

Publication
- Published in: Musée des familles
- Media type: Print
- Publication date: 1865

Chronology
Une ville flottante	Aventures de trois Russes et de trois Anglais dans l'Afrique australe

"The Blockade Runners" (French: Les forceurs de blocus) is an 1865 novella by Jules Verne. In 1871 it was published in single volume together with novel A Floating City as a part of the Voyages Extraordinaires series (The Extraordinary Voyages). An English translation was published in 1874.

== Plot introduction ==
The American Civil War plot centers on the exploits of a British merchant captain named James Playfair who must break the Union blockade of Charleston harbor in South Carolina to trade supplies for cotton and, later in the book, to rescue Jonathan Halliburtt, an abolitionist journalist held prisoner by the Confederates. Playfair's strictly commercial blockade running project was diverted by his infatuation with Halliburtt's daughter Jenny who had joined the crew of his ship disguised as a boy in hopes of joining her father in his captivity in Charleston. Verne's tale was inspired by reality as many ships were actually lost while acting as blockade runners in and around Charleston in the early 1860s.

== Adaptations ==
The book was produced as a radio play of the same name in 2006.
