= César Cascabel =

1890 novel by Jules Verne

Cesar Cascabel
- Author: Jules Verne
- Original title: César Cascabel
- Illustrator: Georges Roux
- Language: French
- Series: The Extraordinary Voyages #35
- Genre: Adventure novel
- Publisher: Pierre-Jules Hetzel
- Publication date: 1890
- Publication place: France
- English publication date: 1890
- Media type: Print (Hardback)
- Preceded by: The Purchase of the North Pole
- Followed by: Mistress Branican

César Cascabel is a novel written by Jules Verne in 1890. It is part of Voyages Extraordinaires series (The Extraordinary Voyages). It was published in English in two-volume form, with subtitles "The Show on Ice" and "The Travelling Circus".

== Plot summary ==
The story starts in Sacramento in 1867. The Cascabels are a French family of circus artists who plan to return home after several years spent touring the United States. However, their savings are stolen, so the family cannot afford the ship fare. Instead, César Cascabel decides to travel overland, via Alaska and Bering Straits, through Siberia and Central Russia with their horse-drawn carriage, the Belle-Roulotte (the Fair Rambler). They expect to encounter no dangers along their intended route.

On their way crossing the Alaskan border, with the help of native girl Kayette, they rescue a Russian political fugitive, count Narkine, whom they bring along so that he can see again his father in Russia. Count Narkine adopts Kayette as his daughter. While in Sitka, the group witnesses the transfer of Alaska to the United States.

On their way from Port Clarence the travellers unfortunately end up on a floating iceberg that drifts in Arctic Ocean to the Lyakhovsky Islands. There they are captured by the natives. Other troubles, including political ones, occur but Cascabels manage to get through the Urals to Perm and then, easily, to France.

An animated TV series inspired by the book was produced in 2001 in France.

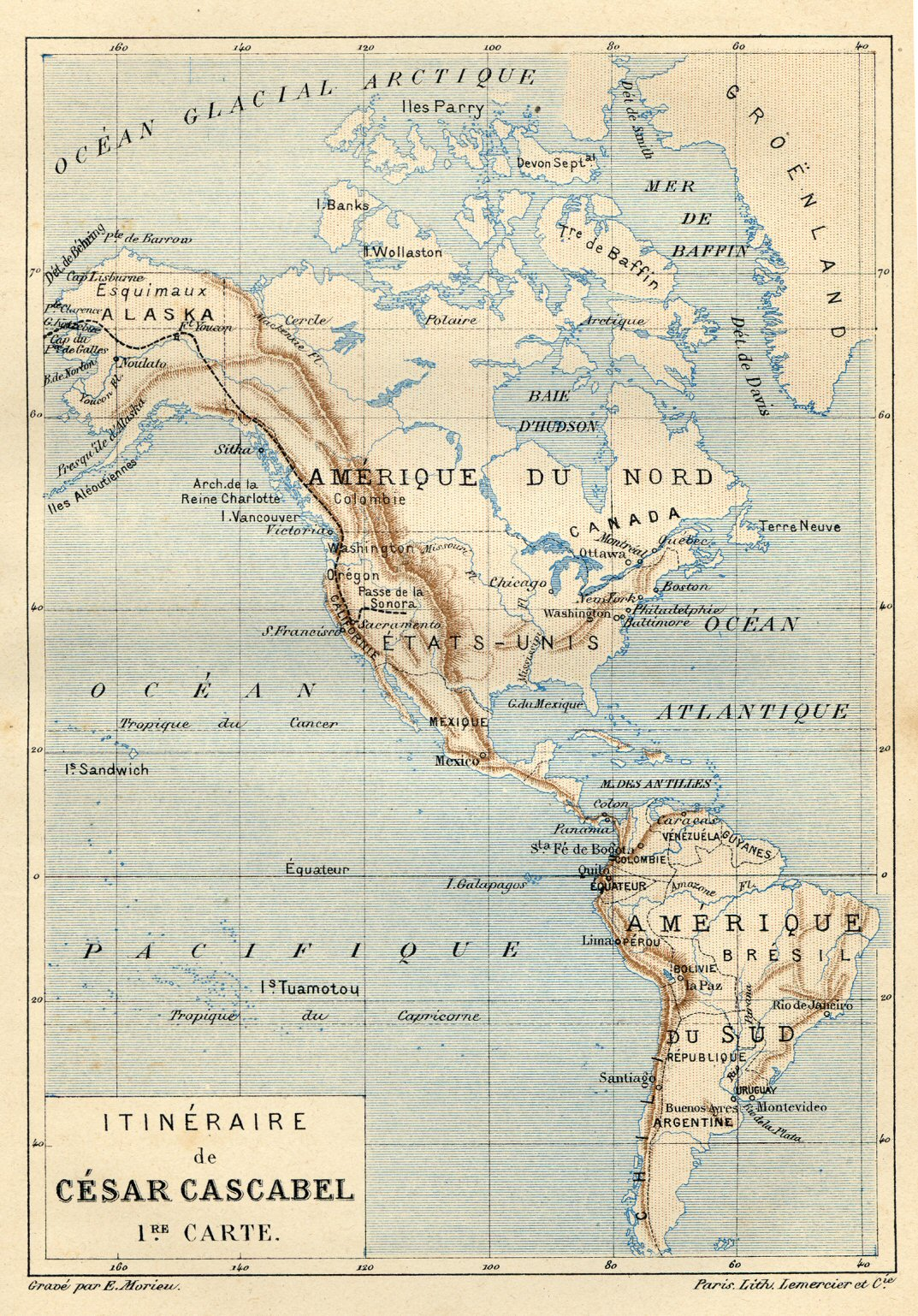
Map of route through Alaska

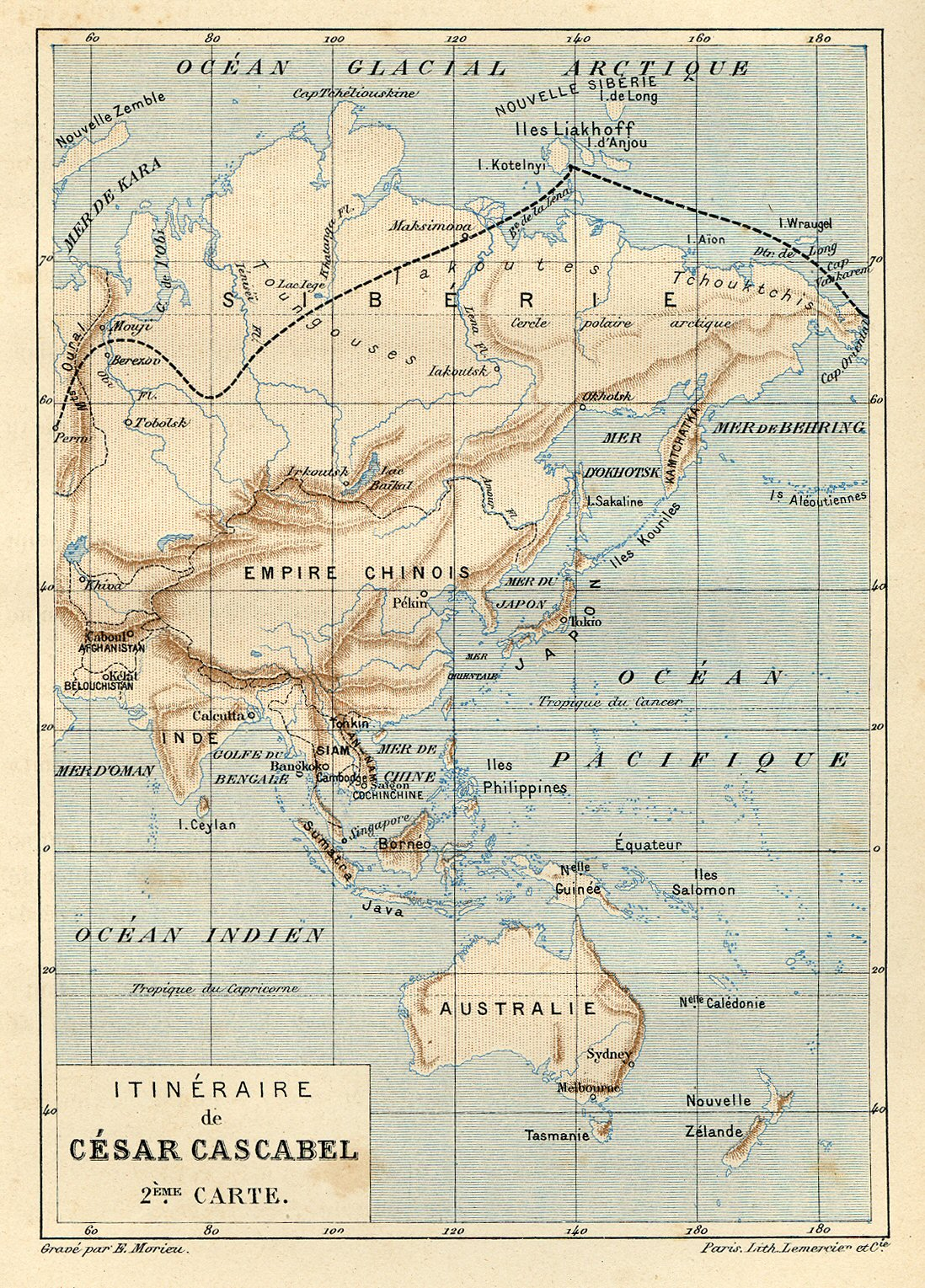
Map of route through Russia
