= Dick Sand, A Captain at Fifteen =

1878 novel by Jules Verne

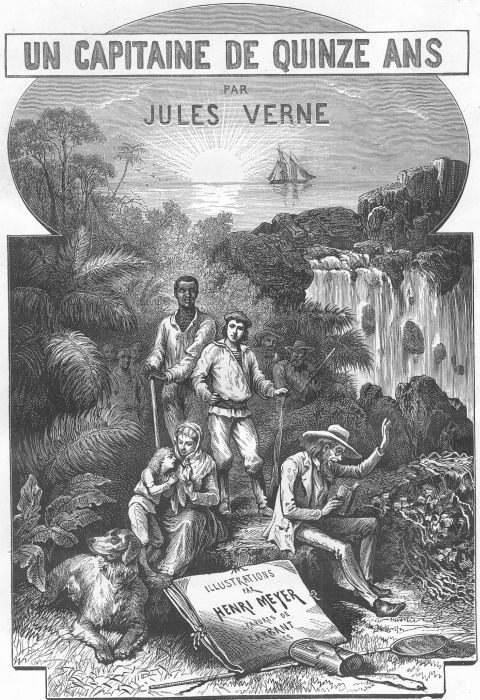
- Author: Jules Verne
- Original title: Un capitaine de quinze ans
- Translator: Ellen Elizabeth Frewer, anonymous
- Illustrator: Henri Meyer
- Language: French
- Series: The Extraordinary Voyages #17
- Genre: Adventure novel
- Publisher: Pierre-Jules Hetzel
- Publication date: 15 December 1878
- Publication place: France
- English publication date: 1878
- Media type: Print (Hardback)
- Preceded by: The Child of the Cavern
- Followed by: The Begum's Fortune

Dick Sand, A Captain at Fifteen (French: Un capitaine de quinze ans) is a Jules Verne novel published in 1878. It deals primarily with the issue of slavery, and the African slave trade by other Africans in particular.

Several adaptations were made, two Soviet and one Franco-Spanish.

== Plot ==
Dick Sand, a fifteen-year-old boy, serves on the schooner Pilgrim, a whaler that normally cruises the Pacific in search of targets. However, the hunting season has been unsuccessful, and as the crew prepare to return home, four people request passage to Valparaiso: Mrs. Weldon, the wife of the hunting firm's owner; her five-year-old son, Jack; his old nanny, Nan; and her cousin, Bénédict, an entomologist. Without much of a choice, the captain accepts.

Several days into their journey northeast, the Pilgrim encounters a shipwreck, with only five survivors—Africans (Tom, Actéon, Austin, Bat, and Hercules), plus a dog (Dingo), all of whom are brought onto the ship and offered passage to America.

As they get proceed east they encounter a whale; the captain and crew decide to hunt it, in an attempt to make some profit off the otherwise failed season. Captain Hull reluctantly leaves Dick responsible for the ship in his absence, while the rest of the crew approaches the whale on a smaller boat. However, while defending itself, the whale destroys the boat, killing the crew and leaving Dick in charge of a ship with no experienced sailors – only the shipwreck survivors are well enough to help him.

However, the ship's cook, Negoro, has sinister plans for the ship. After breaking one of the ship's compasses and leaving them without a measuring device, he places a magnet on the other compass to trick the inexperienced crew into changing their route. In spite of the longer-than-expected travel, the group perseveres, and finally makes land, although the Pilgrim is lost. Negoro escapes with Mrs. Weldon's money.

A man named Harris meets the group, assuring them they are on the Bolivian coast, and encouraging them to follow him into the jungle, saying he can lead them to a nearby city. Dick begins to suspect that they are being lied to as they encounter several animals Harris insists are native, but do not seem to be like any he knows. Dick realizes they are in Africa after the group hears a lion's roar and a horrified Tom – who had been enslaved in his youth – finds several implements. From eavesdropping on Harris, Dick further learns that they are in Angola, that Harris is Negoro's partner in crime, and that he was leading the group in to weaken them and make it easier for him to take Tom and the others into slavery.

Dick and Tom's group decides to keep the truth from Mrs. Weldon and her family, knowing that it will cause undue stress for them. Instead, they tell Mrs. Weldon that Harris lied to them, and Dick tries to lead the group to a river, which he hopes will allow them to reach the shore. A great storm leads the group to take refuge in a large ant-nest, but the nest becomes flooded; the group barely manages to escape alive. This time, though, they encounter a group of slave-traders led by Harris, who takes them prisoner. Only Hercules and Dingo manage to escape, killing several traders and hiding in a thicket to avoid detection. Along with Tom, Bat, Actéon, and Austin, Dick is taken separately from Mrs. Weldon's family, while Nan dies after a forced march becomes too much for her.

Both groups are taken to the lands of the king of Kazoondé, an old, petty ruler who traffics with slave-traders – among them Harris, Negoro, and their chief, José Antonio Álvez – for European commodities. Actéon, Austin, Bat, and Tom are sold into slavery. While none of the others can prevent it, Harris decides to taunt Dick by telling him Mrs. Weldon, Jack, and Bénédict have died as well. Dick answers by jumping on Harris and killing him with his own knife. Dick is made prisoner, and awaits his death. That night, however, after drinking too much alcohol, provided by Álvez, the king dies, burning alive after he tries to drink flaming punch. The king's first wife takes over; in the subsequent funeral ceremony, nearly all of the king's wives, along with Dick Sand, are sacrificed.

However, Mrs. Weldon, Jack, and Bénédict are alive, kept prisoner in Álvez's factory. Negoro intends to use them to blackmail Mrs. Weldon's husband into paying him one hundred thousand dollars. Mrs. Weldon rejects Negoro's demand to write a letter to her husband. However, her hopes that David Livingstone – expected to pass by Kazoondé some time soon – will be able to free her and her family, die when the explorer passes away. Defeated, she writes the letter, which Negoro will take to San Francisco. Meanwhile, Bénédict – allowed out of the factory to pursue his passion for entomology – becomes distracted with a mysterious bug, which he cannot see well because the king of Kazoondé has taken his glasses. This bug leads him out of town and into the jungle, where a large man captures him and takes him away.

At this point the weather suddenly changes – torrential rains submerge the harvests, putting the town at risk of famine. The queen and her ministers have no idea of how to revert this trouble, and none of the local "mgangas" (shamans) are capable of putting a stop to the bad weather, leading the queen to hire a famous mganga living in the north of Angola. This mganga arrives a few days later, and in a ceremony, makes to sacrifice young Jack, before taking him and Mrs. Weldon away... to Dick. The mganga is Hercules, who was also the one to take Bénédict away, and also rescued Dick from drowning. Now reunited, the group takes a canoe downriver, braving several dangers in an attempt to reach the coast. On the way, Dingo leads them to a hut, out of which a tree is marked with the letters SV (the same as on Dingo's collar), a corpse, and a box with a small letter revealing the corpse as Samuel Vernon, a French explorer who was betrayed and murdered by his guide, Negoro – which explains why Dingo constantly growled at the cook. Negoro appears just then, and Dingo kills him, not without dying from a mortal injury caused by Negoro.

The cook, however, is being followed by a group of natives in a canoe. Dick decides to take them on while Hercules gets the rest of the group away. In the fight on board the canoe, which takes place close to a large waterfall, Dick manages to destroy the canoe's oar and saves himself by using the canoe as protection while the natives die. He reunites with his friends again, and the group encounters and joins a caravan of Portuguese traders who are going to the coast, where they take a ship that gets them to San Francisco.

Dick is adopted by the Weldons, who also take Hercules in, thankful for all that he has done. Dick eventually manages to finish his studies, becoming a captain under Mr. Weldon; thanks to his contacts, Mr. Weldon also finds where Tom, Actéon, Austin, and Bat are, freeing them and bringing them to San Francisco, finally reuniting the group after so long a struggle.

== Themes ==
Themes explored in the novel include:

- The painful lessons of adult life – the hero, Dick Sand, must assume command of a ship after the death of his captain.
- The discovery of entomology
- Condemnation of slavery
- Revenge

== Adaptations ==
- Fifteen-Year-Old Captain (Soviet, 1945)
- Un capitán de quince años (Franco-Spanish, 1972), directed by Jesus Franco
- Pilgrim's Captain (Soviet, 1986)
- Piętnastoletni kapitan (The Fifteen-Year-Old Captain), a Polish comic book first published in 1984; it closely followed the book's plot.

Soviet adaptations depart from the original in that they have some different features, such as a happy ending and more characters surviving than in the original story.

== Full text ==
- Dick Sands, the Boy Captain at Standard Ebooks
- Dick Sands the Boy Captain at Project Gutenberg, English translation by Ellen E. Frewer published in 1879.
- Dick Sands the Boy Captain public domain audiobook at LibriVox
- Dick Sand; or, a Captain at Fifteen at Project Gutenberg, a different English translation published in 1878.
- Un capitaine de quinze ans, French edition, 1903, complete scan
