= The Sea Serpent =

Novel by Jules Verne

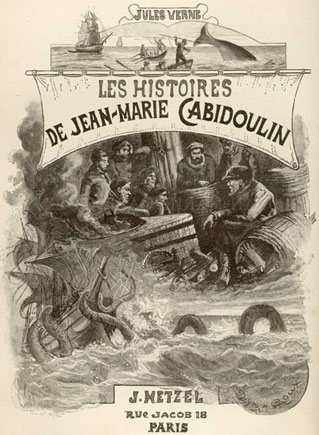
- Title page of 1st illustrated French edition
- Author: Jules Verne
- Original title: Les Histoires de Jean-Marie Cabidoulin
- Translator: I. O. Evans
- Illustrator: Georges Roux
- Language: French
- Series: The Extraordinary Voyages No. 49
- Genre: Adventure novel
- Publisher: Pierre-Jules Hetzel
- Publication date: 1901
- Publication place: France
- English publication date: 1967
- Media type: Print (hardback)
- Preceded by: The Village in the Treetops
- Followed by: The Kip Brothers

The Sea Serpent: The Yarns of Jean Marie Cabidoulin (French: Les Histoires de Jean-Marie Cabidoulin, lit. The Stories of Jean-Marie Cabidoulin) is an adventure novel by French author Jules Verne first published in 1901. The story centers on a French whaling ship, the St. Enoch, which sets out from Le Havre on a voyage to kill whales for their meat and oil. The ship's cooper is the eponymous Cabidoulin, a firm believer in the existence of a giant serpent with a habit of dragging vessels to their doom.

== Publication history ==
- 1967, UK, London, Arco, 191 pp., 60 illus., First English translation
