= The Child of the Cavern =

1877 novel by Jules Verne

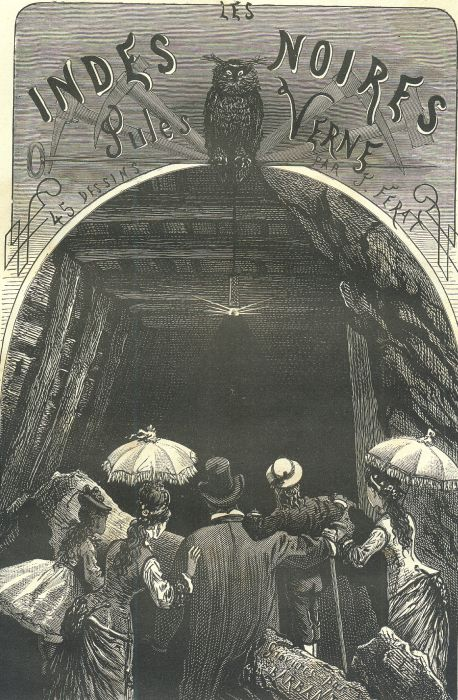
- Author: Jules Verne
- Original title: Les Indes noires
- Translator: W.H.G. Kingston
- Illustrator: Jules Férat
- Language: French
- Series: The Extraordinary Voyages #16
- Genre: Adventure novel
- Publisher: Pierre-Jules Hetzel
- Publication date: April 1877
- Publication place: France
- English publication date: 1877
- Media type: Print (Hardback)
- Preceded by: Off on a Comet
- Followed by: Dick Sand, A Captain at Fifteen

Les Indes noires (literally The Black Indies) is a novel by the French writer Jules Verne, serialized in Le Temps in March and April 1877 and published immediately afterward by Pierre-Jules Hetzel. The first UK edition was published in October 1877 by Sampson Low, Marston, Searle and Rivington as The Child of the Cavern, or Strange Doings Underground. Other English titles for the novel include Black Diamonds and The Underground City.

== Plot summary ==
Covering a time span of over ten years, this novel follows the fortunes of the mining community of Aberfoyle near Stirling, Scotland. Receiving a letter from an old colleague, mining engineer James Starr sets off for the old Aberfoyle mine, thought to have been mined out ten years earlier. Starr finds mine overman Simon Ford and his family living in a cottage deep inside the mine; he is astonished to find that Ford has made a discovery of the presence of a large vein of coal. Accompanying Simon Ford are his wife, Madge, and adult son, Harry.

From the outset, mysterious and unexplained happenings start to occur around the main characters, attributed initially to goblins and firemaidens.

Soon after the discovery of the new vein of coal, the community is revitalised with a whole town growing up around the underground lake called Loch Malcolm.

Suspicious of a malevolent force at work, Harry continues his explorations of the cavern system, where down a deep shaft, he discovers a young orphan girl named Nell. Over the course of the next few years Nell is adopted by Simon and Madge but reveals nothing of where she came from, only that she had never been out of the mine.

Eventually, when Harry and Nell announce their marriage, the mysterious occurrences come to a head. It becomes clear that all of the happenings have been caused by Silfax, another former employee of the mine, who along with his trained snowy owl Harfang has inhabited the mine since its closure. Nell is Silfax' granddaughter, and had lived with him and Harfang until being rescued by Harry.

During the wedding service of Harry and Nell, Silfax attempts to collapse the mine. Nell prevents him from doing so by calling Harfang to her, after which Silfax drowns himself.

== Notes ==
James Starr, a respected member of the Royal Institution, like many of Verne's characters is a member of the academic "aristocracy" of the day.
