= The Fur Country =

1873 novel by Jules Verne

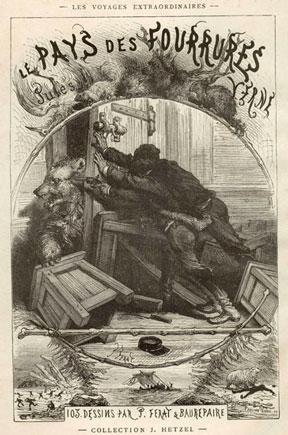
- Title page of 1st illustrated French edition
- Author: Jules Verne
- Original title: Le Pays des fourrures
- Translator: N. d’Anvers
- Illustrator: Jules Férat and Alfred Quesnay de Beaurépaire
- Language: French
- Series: The Extraordinary Voyages #10
- Genre: Adventure novel
- Publisher: Pierre-Jules Hetzel
- Publication date: 1873
- Publication place: France
- English publication date: 1873
- Media type: Print (Hardback)
- Preceded by: The Adventures of Three Englishmen and Three Russians in South Africa
- Followed by: Around the World in Eighty Days

The Fur Country (French: Le Pays des fourrures) or Seventy Degrees North Latitude is an adventure novel by Jules Verne in The Extraordinary Voyages series, first published in 1873. The novel was serialized in Magasin d’Éducation et de Récréation from 20 September 1872 to 15 December 1873. The two-volume first original French edition and the first illustrated large-format edition were published in 1873 by Pierre-Jules Hetzel. The first English translation by N. D’Anvers (pseudonym of Mrs. Arthur (Nancy) Bell) was also published in 1873.

== Plot summary ==
In 1859 Lt. Jasper Hobson and other members of the Hudson's Bay Company travel through the Northwest Territories of Canada to Cape Bathurst on the Arctic Ocean on the mission to create a fort at 70 degrees, north of the Arctic Circle. The area they come to is very rich with wildlife and natural resources. Jasper Hobson and his party (sergeant Long, corporal Joliffe, ten soldiers and three wives) establish a fort here called Esperance. They are accompanied by two women travelers and an astronomer who wants to observe a total Moon eclipse, and later one of the soldier's wives gives birth to a boy. Here they befriend the local Eskimos, including a young girl named Kalumah. They survive an extremely harsh winter with temperatures well below -50 Celsius.

At some point during the winter, an earthquake occurs, and from then on, the laws of physics seem altered (the total eclipse that the astronomer had come to observe is only a partial one, tides are not perceived anymore, traps dug in the ground become flooded) and animals that should have migrated have stayed behind. They eventually realize that the peninsula they had built on was only an iceberg, covered in a thick layer of soil, which broke off from the mainland during the earthquake and is now drifting across the open sea. During a storm, the iceberg drifts very close to its original position and Kalumah tries to reach them, but is shipwrecked on the island, being saved by the only polar bear remaining on it. She manages to rejoin her friends and, during the next winter, the refugees abandon Fort Esperance and attempt to reach the continent by traveling across the frozen sea. However, the rough ice and warm weather prevent them from doing so, and they return to the fort.

Summer comes and the ice island breaks off again, this time heading south, through the Bering Strait. They build a ship to take them to shore, but the warm waters begin to erode the ice base of the island and an avalanche destroys the ship and buries the fort with four people still inside it. After a desperate rescue operation, the rest of the party reach the place where the fort was supposed to be, only to find just rocks and ice. They realize that the sturdy building was not crushed, but simply pushed through the thin ice base under the island. After more digging, they are proved right and find the fort almost completely sunk below the iceberg and manage to rescue the four people trapped inside it.

They replace the crushed ship with a raft as a final escape means, but during a night a large part of the island breaks, taking the raft and any hope with it. The warm waters dissolve the iceberg at an alarming rate, and soon there is only a small part of it left, crowded with all 21 human survivors and dozens of animals, now completely scared and huddling together with them, including the polar bear that had saved Kalumah. Out of scraps of wood they raise a mast with a sail, turning the iceberg into an ice raft. However, the extra speed accelerates the breakdown even further and they realize they have less than a day remaining before it completely dissolves. Some of the party members start considering suicide, but just then they spot land in the distance, only for the ice raft to finally start breaking apart with no hope of reaching the shore.

Suddenly, the astronomer, who had suffered a mental breakdown after missing the eclipse and had been completely quiet ever since, springs into action and uses the compressed air tank and pumps salvaged from the ruins of the fort to stabilize the ice. The expansion of the compressed air generates temperatures below freezing, allowing him to literally "patch" the small ice raft long enough for it to reach the shore of one of the Aleutian islands. Every member in Hobson's party is rescued and they all survive their epic 1800 miles journey, including the polar bear.

== Publication history ==
- 1873, UK, London: Sampson Low, Pub date November 1873; first UK edition, translated by N. D'Anvers (Mrs. Arthur (Nancy) Bell), as The Fur Country or Seventy Degrees North Latitude
- 1874, US, Boston: James Osgood, Pub date 1874; first United States edition
- 1879, UK, Routledge, Pub date 1879; translation by Henry Frith
- 1966, UK, London: Arco, Pub date 1966; abridged and edited by I.O. Evans in 2 volumes as The Sun in Eclipse and Through the Behring Strait
- 1987, Canada, Toronto: NC Press ISBN 0-920053-82-3, Pub date October 1987; new translation by Edward Baxter
- 2008, UK, Classic Comic Store Ltd, Classics Illustrated (JES) #41 facsimile edition (JES13027), retitled "The Floating Island"
