= A Drama in Mexico =

- Short story by Jules Verne
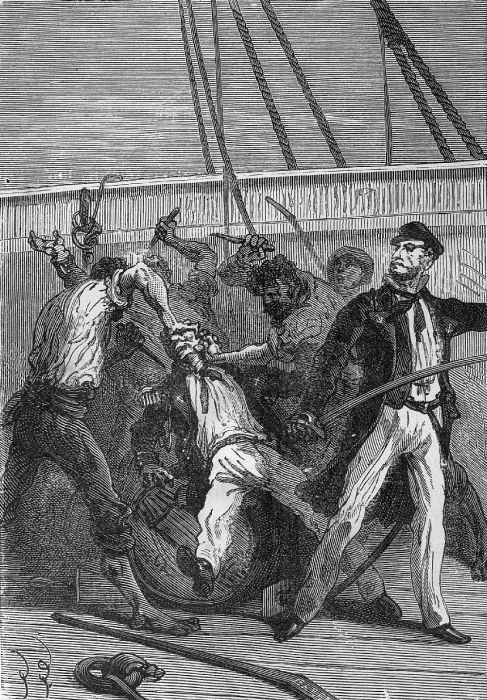
- Illustration by Jules Férat, 1876
- Original title: Un drame au Mexique
- Translator: W. H. G. Kingston (1876)
- Country: France
- Language: French
- Genre: historical short story

Publication
- Published in: Musée des familles
- Publication type: Periodical
- Publication date: 1851
- Published in English: 1876

"A Drama in Mexico" (French: Un drame au Mexique) is a historical short story by Jules Verne, first published in July 1851 under the title "L'Amérique du Nord, études historiques: Les Premiers Navires de la marine mexicaine."

In a letter to his father Verne wrote that it "is but a simple adventure-story in the style of [James Fenimore] Cooper which I am locating in Mexico."

== Plot outline ==
In 1825, off the islands of Guam on a passage from Spain, Lieutenant Martinez, and his associates plot a mutiny on board of two Spanish warships. Conspirators murder Captain Don Orteva, take command of the ships, and plan to sell them to the republican government in Mexico. On arrival in Acapulco, Lieutenant Martinez and Jose embark on a cross-country trip to Mexico City to effect the sale. Martinez becomes increasingly fearful that he is being pursued by Ortega's loyal followers, and during a stormy night in the mountains murders Jose in a moment of madness and is then toppled to his death in a mountain torrent by the men he feared.

== Publication history ==
The story was originally published in French in July 1851 as "L'Amérique du Nord, études historiques: Les Premiers Navires de la marine mexicaine" in Musée des familles with three illustrations by Eugène Forest and Alexandre de Bar. A renamed and revised version, "Un drame au Mexique," with six illustrations by Jules Férat, was published in 1876 together with the novel Michel Strogoff as a part of the Voyages Extraordinaires series. The first English translation by W. H. G. Kingston was published in London in 1876.

=== English publication ===
as "The Mutineers: A Romance of Mexico" (translated by W. H. G. Kingston) in

- 1876 - Michael Strogoff, the Courier of the Czar; and The Mutineers: A Romance of Mexico, London: Sampson Low
- 1877 - New York: Scribners (translation "revised" by Julius Chambers)

as "The Mutineers, or A Tragedy of Mexico" in

- 1911 - Works of Jules Verne, Vol. 1, New York: Vincent Parke, ed. Charles F. Horne

as "A Drama in Mexico" in

- 1964 - Dr. Ox, and Other Stories, London: Arco/Westport, CT: Associated Booksellers: Fitzroy Edition, ed. I. O. Evans

as "The First Ships of the Mexican Navy" in

- 1999 - The Eternal Adam, and Other Stories, London: Phoenix, trans. I. O. Evans, ed. Peter Costello
