= A Drama in the Air =

- Short story by Jules Verne
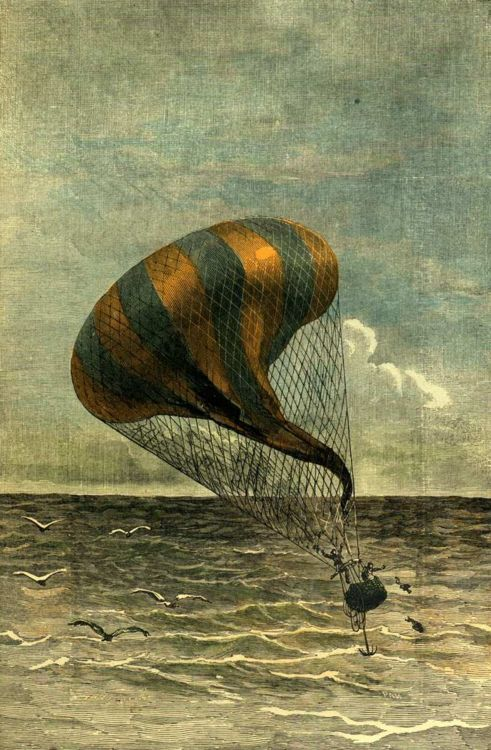
- Original title: Un drame dans les airs
- Translator: Anne T. Wilbur
- Country: France
- Language: French

Publication
- Published in: "Museé des Familles"
- Publication date: August 1851
- Published in English: May 1852

"A Drama in the Air" (French: "Un drame dans les airs") is an adventure short story by Jules Verne. The story was first published in August 1851 under the title "Science for families. A Voyage in a Balloon" (French: "La science en famille. Un voyage en ballon") in Musée des familles with five illustrations by Alexandre de Bar. In 1874, with six illustrations by Émile-Antoine Bayard, it was included in Doctor Ox, the only collection of Jules Verne's short stories published during Verne's lifetime. An English translation by Anne T. Wilbur, published in May 1852 in Sartain's Union Magazine of Literature, marked the first time a work by Jules Verne was translated into the English language.

== Plot outline ==
Just as the narrator starts the ascent of his balloon, a stranger jumps into its car. The unexpected passenger's only intent is to take the balloon as high as it will go, even at the cost of his and pilot's life. The intruder takes advantage of the long journey to recount the history of incidents related to the epic of lighter-than-air travel.

This short story foreshadows Verne's first novel, Five Weeks in a Balloon.

== English publication ==
The story has appeared in English translation in the following forms.

As "A Voyage in a Balloon" (translated by Anne T. Wilbur):

- 1852 – Sartain's Union Magazine of Literature

As "A Drama in Mid-Air" (translated by Abby L. Alger):

- 1874 – From the Clouds to the Mountains, Boston: Gill

As "A Drama in the Air" (translated by George M. Towle):

- 1874 – Dr. Ox and Other Stories, Boston: Osgood
- 1876 – A Winter Amid the Ice, and Other Stories, London: Sampson Low
- 1911 – Works of Jules Verne, Vol.1, New York: Vincent Parke, ed. Charles F. Horne
- 1964 – Dr. Ox, and Other Stories, London: Arco/Westport, CT: Associated Booksellers: Fitzroy Edition, ed. I. O. Evans
- 1999 – The Eternal Adam, and other Stories, London: Phoenix, ed. Peter Costello
