= An Ideal City =

1875 short story by Jules Verne

"An Ideal City" (French: Une ville idéale) is an 1875 short story by Jules Verne. It was first delivered as a public lecture in 1875. The story describes a dream vision of Amiens, France, in the year 2000. Some elements described the completion of projects that were already planned in 1875, while others were highly speculative.

== Synopsis ==
Verne describes dreaming about Amiens in the year 2000, in which it has become the titular ideal city. Some of his envisioned changes include reforms that the city had already planned, and which Verne himself oversaw when he later became a municipal councilor. The streets have been re-paved, electric lights have replaced gas lamps, and new omnibus and tram lines have improved the city's transportation. A new technology allows music recitals to be heard all over the world after being transmitted from the wires connected to an artist's piano. Schools no longer teach Latin or Greek, focusing on technical education. Other changes include a bachelor tax which has led to a high marriage rate, and a new health system in which doctors are only paid while their patients are healthy.

== Publication history ==
Verne moved to Amiens in 1871. He first presented the story as a public lecture hosted by the Amiens Academy of Science, Literature, and the Arts, of which he was the director. The lecture was delivered December 12, 1875, and published the next day by the Journal d'Amiens, Moniteur de la Somme. It was also published the next year in Sur terre et sur mer, journal illustré de voyages et d'aventures, the antecedent to the longer-lived Journal des voyages et des aventures de terre et de mer.

There have been two modern editions. In 1973, the Office Culturel D'Amiens published a limited edition of 2000 copies. The book also included the short story "Vingt-Quatre Minutes en ballon" and was annotated by Daniel Compere. In 1999, the Centre de documentation Jules Verne published a commemorative edition illustrated by young designers local to Amiens.

== Analysis ==
The literary scholar Nadia Minerva describes "An Ideal City" as "a recit d'anticipation ... where the two traditional aspects of utopia – the questioning of what exists and the project – are very present, but in unequal measure and in the form of a joke."

Daniel Compère, the founder of the Centre de documentation Jules Verne, says the "text is not science fiction, nor an anticipation, nor even a true utopia. More than a vision of the future, it is a criticism of the city as it exists in 1875."
