= Tony Johannot =

French engraver, illustrator and painter (1803–1852)

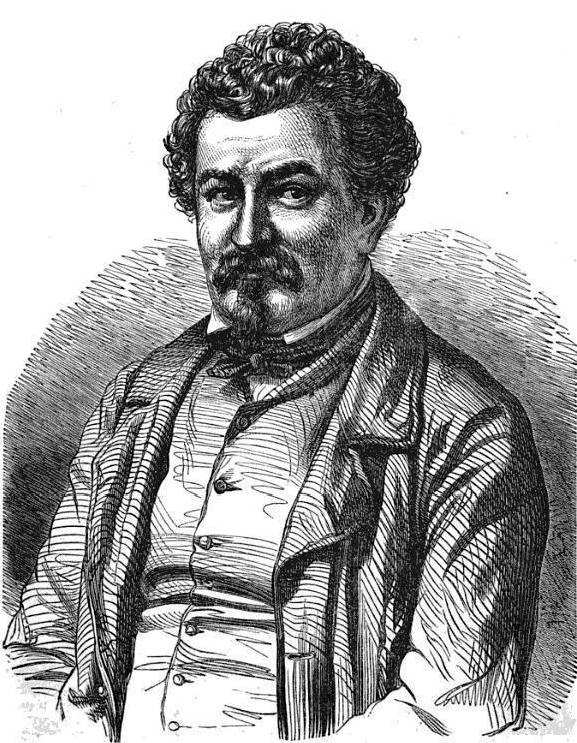
Tony Johannot.

Antoine Johannot, known commonly as Tony Johannot (pronounced [ɑ̃twan ʒɔano]; 9 November 1803 – 4 August 1852), was a French engraver, illustrator and painter.

== Biography ==
He was born in Offenbach am Main. His father, François Johannot (c. 1760–1838), owned a silk factory in Germany, where the family had fled after the revocation of the Edict of Nantes. He was a painter who was involved in the development of lithography in France. The two older brothers of Tony, Charles and Alfred, were engravers, and Alfred also worked as a painter and draughtsman. Tony learnt engraving from his brothers and helped Alfred produce illustrations of books by James Fenimore Cooper and Walter Scott. Tony came to prefer wood-engraving, but resumed etching in 1845. His historical paintings were exhibited at the Paris Salon for the first time in 1831.

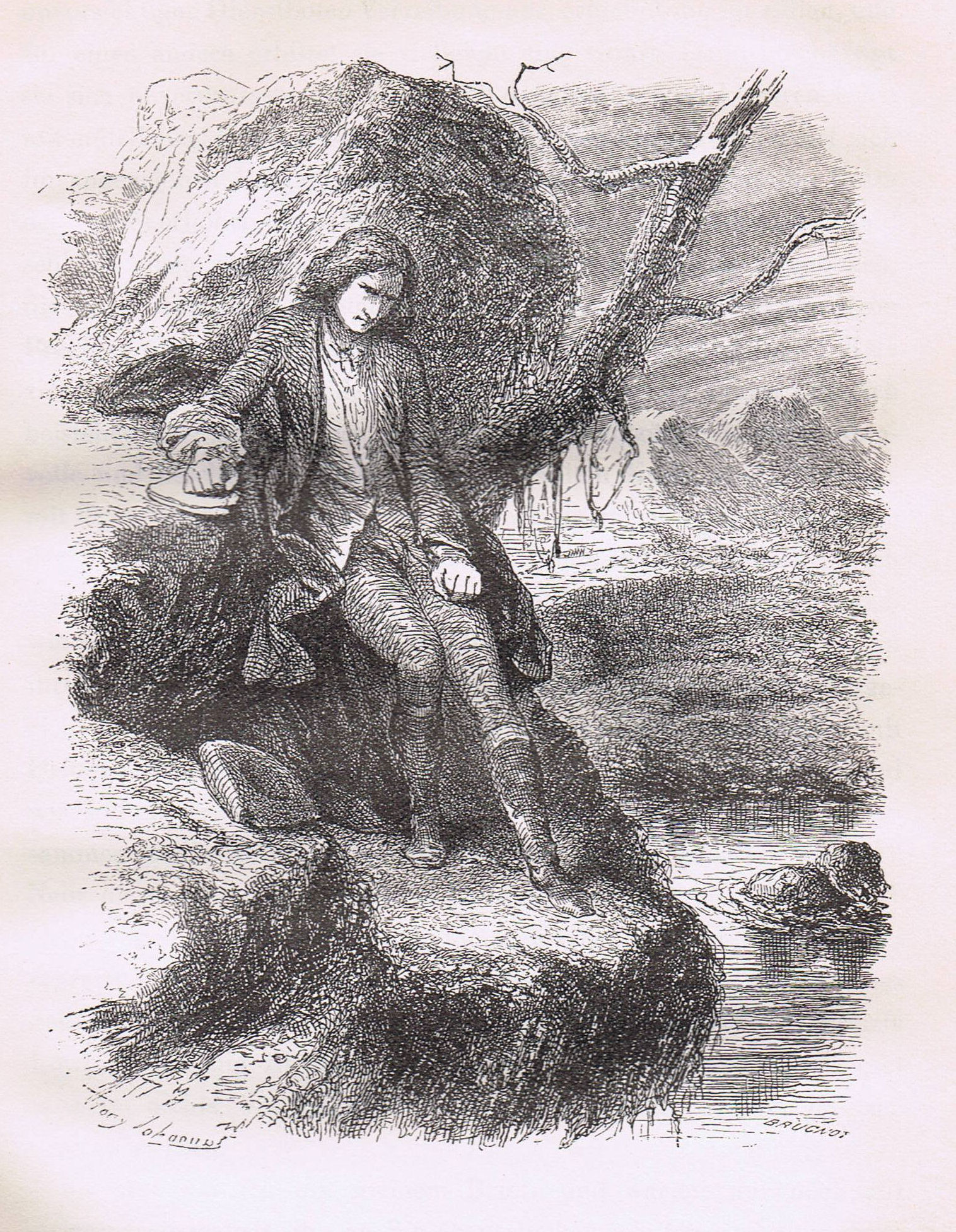
Illustration (c. 1840) for La Nouvelle Héloïse (1761) by Rousseau

He became an illustrator much prized for his elegance, his diversity, and the lively character of his drawings, which were converted to engravings either by himself or by such artists as Jacques Adrien Lavieille, Émile Montigneul, and Alfred Revel. He was praised by Théophile Gautier:

Tony Johannot can be called, without fear of contradiction, the king of illustration. Only a few years ago, no novel, no poem could appear in print without an engraving in wood bearing his signature: such heroines of delicate frame, with the necks of swans, flowing hair, imperceptible foot, he has confided to the rice-paper! How many vagabonds in rags, knights armoured from head to foot, tarasques scaled and clawed, he has tossed upon the butter-coloured and canary-yellow covers of novels of the Middle Ages; all the poetry and all the literature, of both ancient and modern times, has passed through his hands: the Bible, Molière, Cervantes, Rousseau, Walter Scott, Lord Byron, Bernardin de Saint-Pierre, Goethe, Chateaubriand, Lamartine, Hugo: he has comprehended all. His drawings appear in all these admirable volumes, and not one seems out of place. By the sides of these sublime pages, of these harmonious verses, they are an ornament and no stain; whatever these diverse geniuses have dreamt, he has been able to recreate and pull bodily into his art.

Johannot died in Paris on 4 August 1852.

== Gallery ==
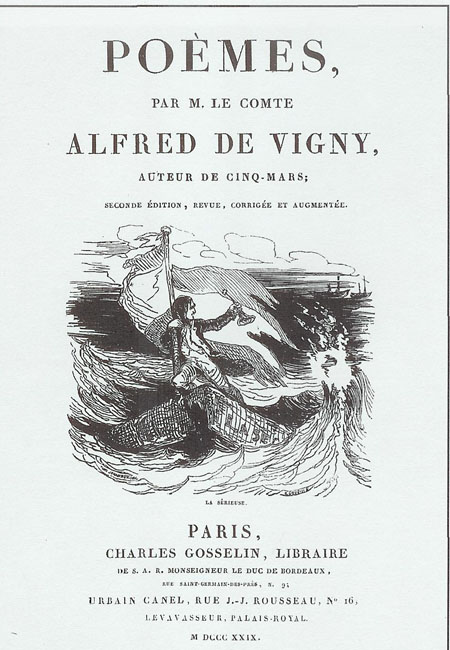
Title page for poems by Alfred de Vigny

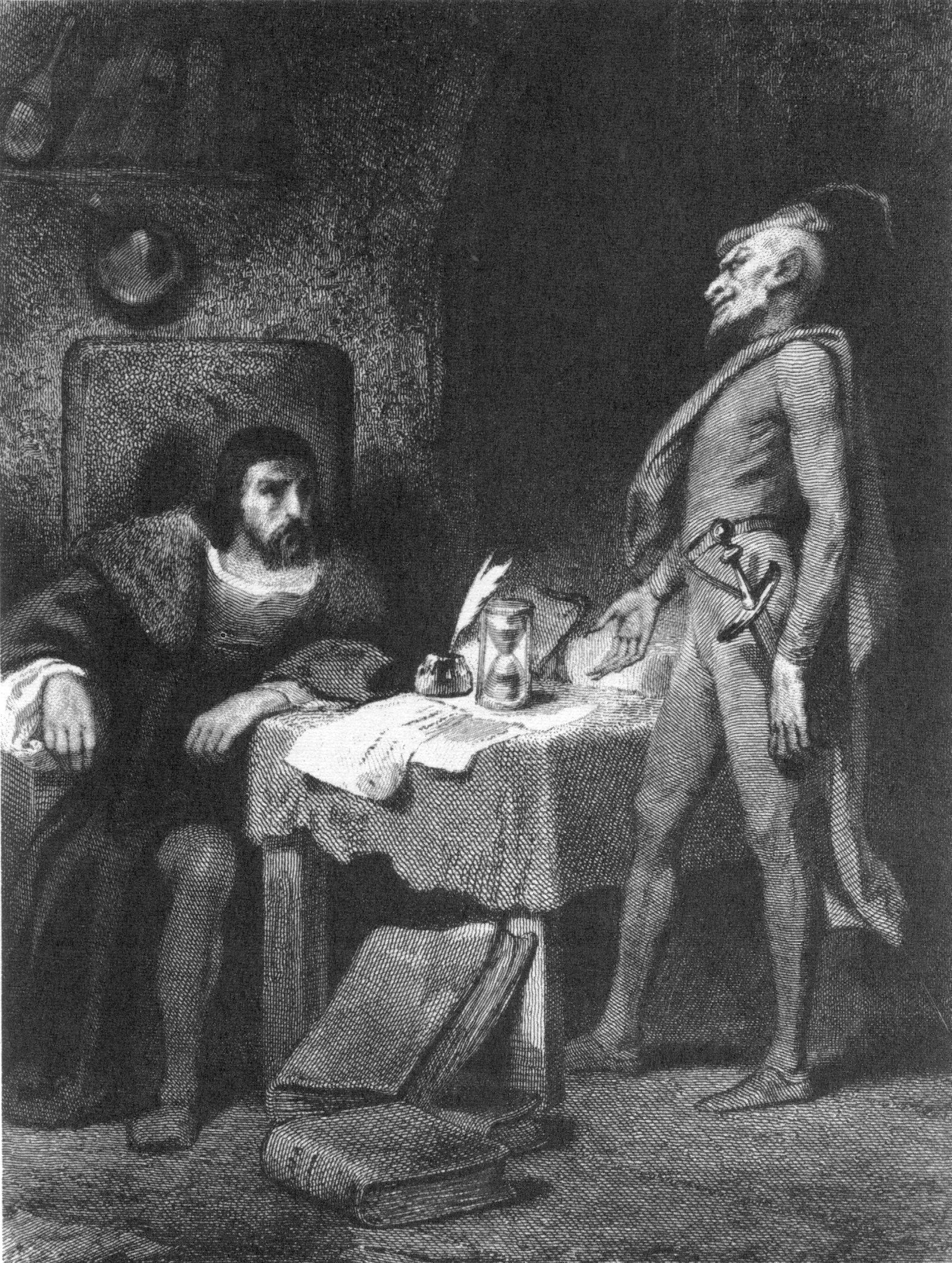
Faust and Mephistopheles

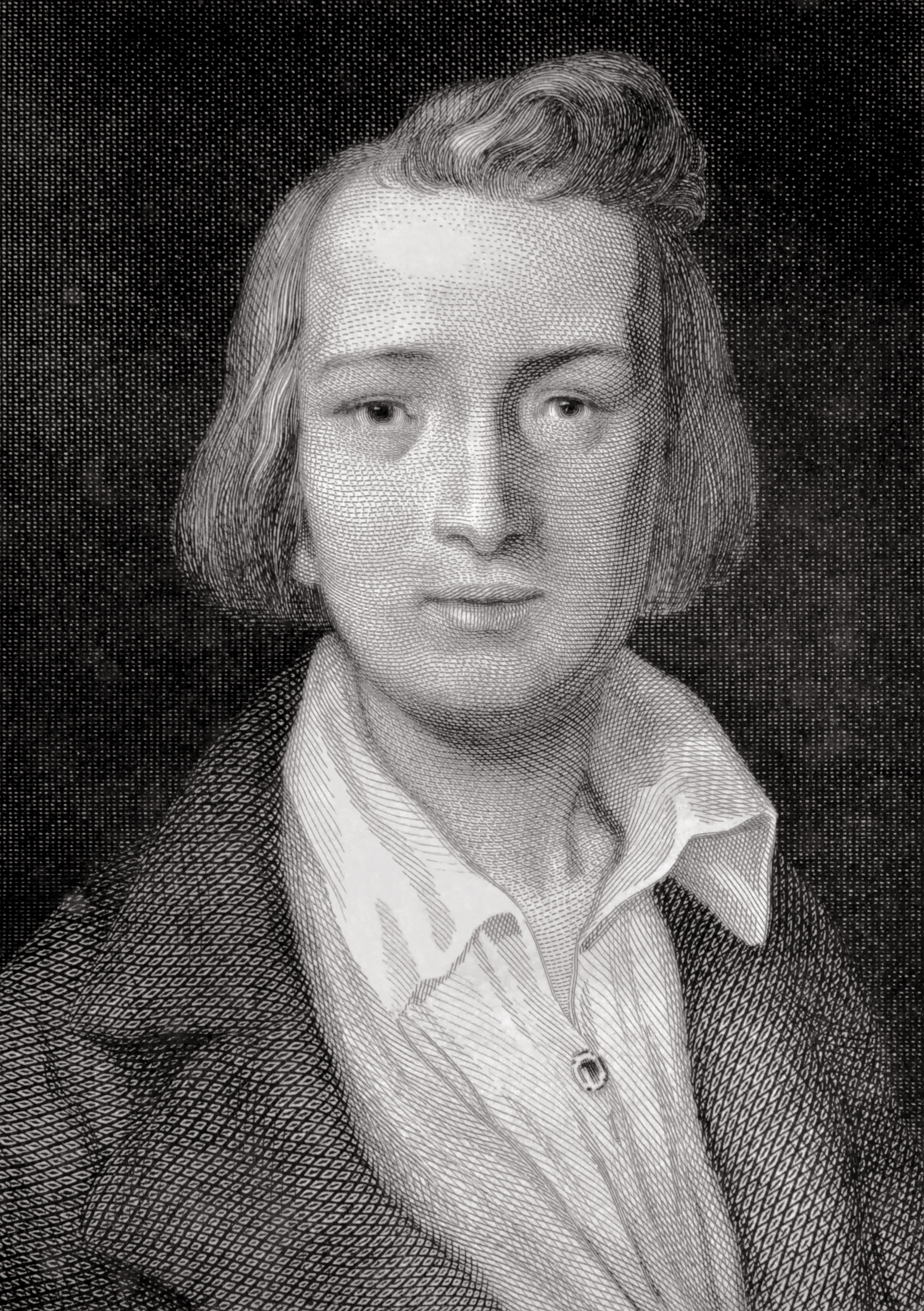
Portrait of Heinrich Heine

== Works ==
- Magazines: Revue des Deux Mondes, L’Artiste, L'Illustration, Le Magasin Pittoresque.
- Histoire du Roi de Bohême et de ses sept châteaux by Charles Nodier (1830).
- Théatre complet of Eugène Scribe (1834) -- 2nd edition, chez Aimé André.
- The Complete Works of Lord Byron (1835).
- Œuvres illustrées of Molière (1835–1836).
- Don Quixote by Miguel de Cervantes (1836–1837).
- Paul et Virginie by Bernardin de Saint-Pierre (1838).
- Manon Lescaut by Abbé Prévost (1839).
- Les Français peints par eux-mêmes (1840–1842).
- L'Âne mort by Jules Janin (1842).
- Voyage où il vous plaira by Musset and Stahl, chez Hetzel (1843).
- La Comédie humaine by Balzac, edition Furne (1842–1846).
- La Bretagne ancienne et moderne by Pitre-Chevalier (1845).
- Faust by Goethe (1847).
- Raphaêl by Lamartine (1849–1850), Perrotin edition.
- Œuvres illustrées of George Sand (1852–1856).
- Jérôme Paturot à la recherche de la meilleure des républiques by Louis Reybaud, chez Michel Lévy frères (1849).

== Bibliography ==
- Aristide Marie, Alfred et Tony Johannot, peintres, graveurs et vignettistes, H. Floury, coll. "La Vie et l'art romantiques", Paris, 1925.
- La Grande Encyclopédie (sous la direction d'André Berthelot) (tome 21)
- Dictionnaire des illustrateurs, 1800–1914. Sous la direction de Marcus Osterwalder. Éditions Ides et Calendes, 1989. p. 538-539.
