= Off on a Comet =

1877 novel by Jules Verne

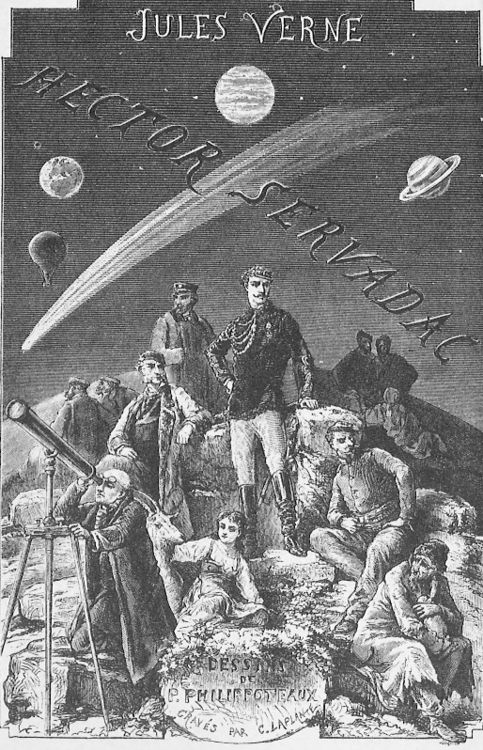
- Drawing by Paul Philippoteaux, engraving by Charles Laplante (fr), 1877
- Author: Jules Verne
- Original title: Hector Servadac
- Translator: Unknown (1877), Ellen Frewer (1877), Edward Roth (1877-78), I. O. Evans (1965)
- Illustrator: Paul Philippoteaux
- Language: French
- Series: The Extraordinary Voyages #15
- Genre: Science fiction, adventure
- Publisher: Pierre-Jules Hetzel
- Publication date: 1877
- Publication place: France
- English publication date: 1877
- Media type: Print (hardcover)
- Preceded by: Michael Strogoff
- Followed by: The Child of the Cavern

Off on a Comet (French: Hector Servadac) is an 1877 science fiction novel by French writer Jules Verne. It recounts the journey of several people carried away by a comet contacting the Earth. The comet passes by various bodies in the Solar System before returning the travelers to the Earth.

== Synopsis ==
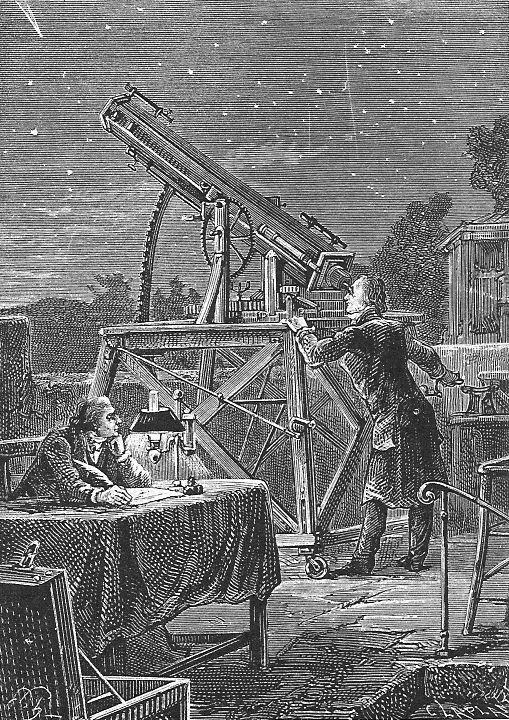
John Herschel observes Comet Halley from his observatory in Cape Town in 1835 (illustration from the book).

The story starts with a comet called Gallia, that touches the Earth in its flight and collects a few small chunks of it. The disaster occurs on January 1 of the year 188x in the area around Gibraltar. On the territory that is carried away by the comet there remain a total of 36 people of French, English, Spanish and Russian nationality. These people do not realize at first what has happened, and consider the collision an earthquake.

They first notice weight loss: Captain Servadac's adjutant Ben Zoof, to his amazement, jumps 12 m (39 ft) high. Zoof with Servadac also soon notice that the alternation of day and night is shortened to six hours, that east and west have changed sides, and that water begins to boil at 66 °C (151 °F), from which they rightly deduce that the atmosphere became thinner and pressure dropped. At the beginning of their stay in Gallia they notice the Earth with the Moon, but think it is an unknown planet. Other important information is obtained through their research expedition with a ship, which the comet also took.

During the voyage they discover a mountain chain blocking the sea, which they initially consider to be the Mediterranean Sea and then they find the island of Formentera (before the catastrophe a part of the Balearic Islands), where they find French astronomer Palmyrin Rosette, who helps them to solve all the mysterious phenomena. They are all on a comet which Rosette discovered a year ago and predicted to be on a collision course with Earth, but no one believed the astronomer, because a layer of thick fog at the time prevented astronomical observations in other places.

A new research expedition determines the circumference of Gallia to be 2,320 km (1,440 mi). The mass of the comet is calculated by Rosette. He determines it at 209,346 billion tonnes. For the calculation he uses spring scales and forty 5-franc silver coins, the weight of which on earth equaled exactly 1 kg (2.2 lb). However, the owner of the scales, Isaac Hakkabut, has rigged the instrument, so the results have to be cut by a quarter.

The involuntary travelers through the Solar system do not have any hope for long-term colonization of their new world, because it is lacking arable land. They feed themselves mainly with the animals that were left on the chunk carried away by Gallia. One strange phenomenon they meet is that the sea on the comet does not freeze, even though the temperature drops below the freezing point (believed to be due to the theory that a stagnant water surface resists freezing longer than when rippled by wind). Once a stone is thrown into the sea, the sea freezes in a few moments. The ice is completely smooth and allows skating and sleigh sailing.

Despite the dire situation in which the castaways find themselves, old power disputes from Earth continue on Gallia, because the French and English officers consider themselves the representatives of their respective governments. The object of their interest is for example previously Spanish Ceuta, which has become an island on the comet and which both parties start to consider an unclaimed territory. Captain Servadac therefore attempts to occupy Ceuta, without success. It turns out that the island has been occupied by Englishmen, who maintain a connection to their base at Gibraltar through an optical telegraph.

Gallia gets to an extreme point of its orbit and begins its return to Earth. In early November Rossete's refined calculations show that there will be a new collision with the Earth, exactly two years after the first, again on January 1. Therefore, the idea is conceived of leaving the comet at collision time in a balloon. The proposal is approved and the castaways make a balloon out of the sails of their ship. In mid-December there is an earthquake, in which Gallia partially falls apart and loses a fragment, which probably kills all Englishmen in Ceuta and Gibraltar. When on January 1 there is again a contact between the atmospheres of Gallia and Earth, the space castaways leave in the balloon and land safely two kilometers from Mostaganem in Algeria.

== Main characters ==
The 36 inhabitants of Gallia include a German Jew, an Italian, three Frenchmen, eight Russians, 10 Spaniards, and 13 British soldiers. The main characters are:

- Captain Hector Servadac of the French Algerian army
- Laurent Ben Zoof, Servadac's aide
- Count Wassili Timascheff of Russia
- Lt. Procope, the commander of Timascheff's yacht, Dobrina
- Isaac Hakkabut, a stereotyped Jewish trader
- Nina, a cheerful young Italian goatherd (girl).
- Pablo, a Spanish boy
- Colonel Heneage Finch Murphy and Major Sir John Temple Oliphant of Britain's Gibraltar garrison. In the French original Murphy is actually a Brigadier (General), a rank too high to be the butt of Verne's joking description as playing an interminable game of chess without a pawn being taken. The translator accordingly demoted him to the rank of Colonel, a rank less likely to cause offense.
- Palmyrin Rosette, a French astronomer and discoverer of the comet and previously Servadac's teacher.

== Publication history ==
The book was first published in France (Hetzel Edition, 1877).

The English translation by Ellen E. Frewer, was published in England by Sampson Low (November 1877), and the U.S. by Scribner Armstrong with the title Hector Servadac; Or the Career of a Comet. The Frewer translation alters the text considerably with additions and emendations, paraphrases dialogue, and rearranges material, although the general thread of the story is followed. The translation was made from the serial version of the novel, published January to December 1877.

Verne had problems with this novel from the very beginning. Originally he intended that Gallia would crash into the earth, killing everybody aboard. This may have been the motivation for naming the hero "Servadac" with the mirror of the French word cadavres ("corpses"), predicting all would die on the "return". His publisher Hetzel would not accept this however, given the large juvenile readership in his monthly magazine, and Verne was forced to graft an optimistic ending onto the story, allowing the inhabitants of Gallia to escape the crash in a balloon.

At the same time George Munro in New York published an anonymous translation in a newspaper format as #43 of his Seaside Library books. This is the only literal translation containing all the dialogue and scientific discussions. Unfortunately the translation stops after Part II Chapter 10, and continues with the Frewer translation.

The same year a still different translation by Edward Roth was published in Philadelphia by Claxton, Remsen, and Heffelfinger in two parts. Part I (October 1877) was entitled To the Sun and Part II (May 1878) Off on a Comet. This was reprinted in 1895 by David McKay.

Occasional reprints of these books were published around 1900 by Norman L. Munro, F.M. Lupton, Street&Smith, Hurst and Co., and Federal Book Co.

In 1911, Vincent Parke and Company published a shortened version of the Frewer translation, omitting Part II, Chapter 3. Parke used the title Off on a Comet, and since that time the book has usually been referred to with that title instead of the correct one, Hector Servadac.

In 1926, the first two issues of Amazing Stories carried Off on a Comet in two parts.

in 1957 Ace books released an abridged and ‘modernised’ translation by ‘A.A. Wyn, Inc.’ in D-245 titled ‘Off on a comet’.

In 1959, Classics Illustrated released Off on a Comet as a graphic novel (issue #149).

In 1960 Dover (New York) re-published the Roth translations, unabridged, as Space Novels by Jules Verne, including reproductions of the original engravings from the first French editions. In 1965 the I. O. Evans condensation of the Frewer translation was published in two volumes as Anomalous Phenomena and Homeward Bound by ARCO, UK and Associated Booksellers, US. University Press of the Pacific, Honolulu, re-published the Frewer translation in 2000.

In September 2007, Solaris Books (U.K.) published Off on a Comet as an appendix to Splinter by Adam Roberts, as a slightly edited version of the Parke edition.

In a 2007 blog post on The Guardian, Adam Roberts reviewed one 1877 translation. Roberts felt that the translation was inaccurate and incomplete. Roberts' criticism is, however, somewhat vindicated by the fact that the version of Hector Servadac he was criticizing was the corrupt version of the original Frewer translation found on Project Gutenberg (based on the Parke edition, above), which was made from a different French original than the one he was using.

In October 2007, Choptank Press published an on-line version of Munro's 1877 Hector Servadac, Travels and Adventures through the Solar System edited by Norman Wolcott, followed (December 2007) by Hector Servadac: The Missing Ten Chapters from the Munro Translation newly translated by Norman Wolcott and Christian Sánchez.

In 2008, the Choptank Press published a combined book version Hector Servadac: Travels and Adventures Through the Solar System containing: (I) An enlarged replica of Seaside Library edition #43 as published by George Munro, New York, 1877; (II)A typeset version of the same in large readable type; (III) A new translation of the last 10 chapters from the original French by Norman Wolcott and Christian Sanchez in the literal style of the remainder of the book; and (IV) 100 illustrations from the original publications enlarged to 8 1/2-by-11-inch (216 mm × 279 mm) format.

== Antisemitism controversy ==
The first appearance in French was in the serial magazine Magasin d'éducation et de récréation, commencing on 1 January 1877 and ending on 15 December 1877. It was in June 1877 when chapter 18 appeared with the introduction and description of Isac Hakhabut:

He was a man of fifty years, who looked sixty. Small, weakly, with eyes bright and false, a busked nose, a yellowish beard and unkempt hair, large feet, hands long and hooked, he offered the well-known type of the German Jew, recognizable among all. This was the usurer with supple back-bone, flat-hearted, a clipper of coins and a skin-flint. Silver should attract such a being as the magnet attracts iron, and if this Shylock was allowed to pay himself from his debtor, he would certainly sell the flesh at retail. Besides, although a Jew originally, he made himself a Mahometan in Mahometan provinces, when his profit demanded it, and he would have been a pagan to gain more.

This prompted the chief rabbi of Paris, Zadoc Kahn, to write a letter to Hetzel, objecting that this material had no place in a magazine for young people. Hetzel and Verne co-signed a reply indicating they had no intention of offending anyone, and promising to make corrections in the next edition. However Verne left the salvage work to Hetzel, asking Hetzel at the end of the summer, "Have you arranged the affair of the Jews in Servadac?" The principal change was to replace "Jew" with "Isac" throughout, and to add "Christian countries" to those where Hakhabut plied his trade.The anti-semitic tone remained however, sales were lower than for other Verne books, and the American reprint houses saw little profit with only a single printing by George Munro in a newspaper format. Even the Hetzel revised version has never been translated into English, as both Victorian translations were made from the magazine version. This has caused some modern reviewers to unfairly criticize the early translators, assuming that they had inserted the anti-semitic material which Verne actually wrote.

== Film adaptations ==
- Valley of the Dragons a Columbia Picture directed by Edward Bernds

Valley of the Dragons at IMDb

- Na kometě ("On the Comet"), directed by Karel Zeman, Czechoslovakia, 1970.

Na Komete at IMDb

- Off on a Comet, an animated adaptation, directed by Richard Slapczynski, Australia, 1979.

Off on a Comet at IMDb

A 1962 version of the novel was to have been filmed by American International Pictures but the film was never made. Various 1962 issues of Charlton Comics offered a contest where a winner would visit the set of the film.

== Influences ==
Off on a Comet was the inspiration for a 2007 novel by Adam Roberts, Splinter.

== See also ==
- Comets in fiction
