= The Adventures of Three Englishmen and Three Russians in South Africa =

1872 novel by Jules Verne

The Adventures of Three Russians and Three Englishmen in South Africa
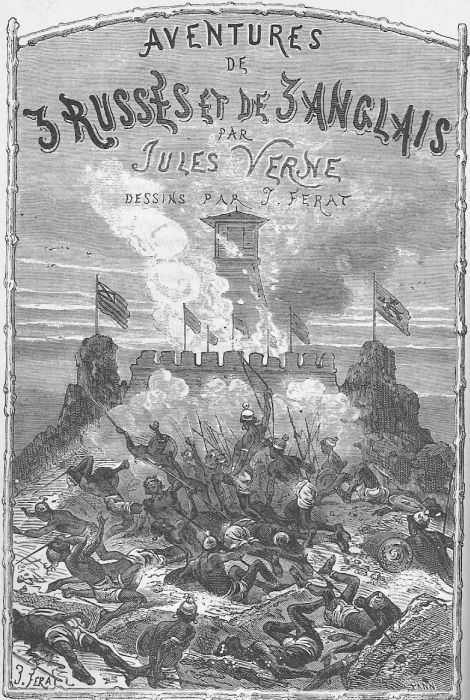
- Author: Jules Verne
- Original title: Aventures de trois Russes et de trois Anglais dans l'Afrique australe
- Translator: Nancy Bell
- Illustrator: Jules Férat
- Language: French
- Series: The Extraordinary Voyages #9
- Genre: Adventure novel
- Publisher: Pierre-Jules Hetzel
- Publication date: 1872
- Publication place: France
- English publication date: 1872
- Media type: Print (Hardback)
- ISBN: 1-410-10028-6 (2002 edition)
- Preceded by: A Floating City
- Followed by: The Fur Country

The Adventures of Three Russians and Three Englishmen in South Africa (French: Aventures de trois Russes et de trois Anglais dans l'Afrique australe) is a novel by Jules Verne published in 1872.

== Plot introduction ==
Three Russian and three English scientists depart to South Africa to measure the 24th meridian east. As their mission is proceeding, the Crimean War breaks out, and the members of the expedition find themselves citizens of enemy countries. This novel can be found under alternate titles such as Adventures in the Land of the Behemoth, Measuring a Meridian, and Meridiana or Adventures in South Africa. Interestingly, the travelers, on their homeward journey, reach Victoria Falls on 25 May 1855, thus anticipating the discovery by David Livingstone by nearly six months.

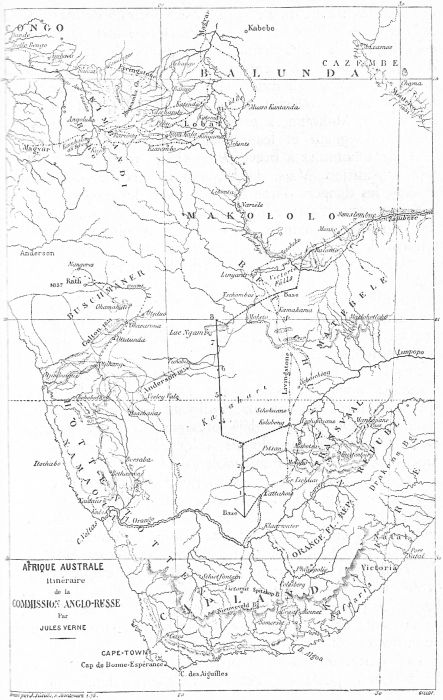
Map of Southern Africa by Jules Férat.

== Publication ==
It was first published in French in 1872. English translations were published in New York in 1873 and London in 1876. In 1874 it was also published as the first half of a two-part volume entitled, Stories of Adventure along with Journey to the Center of the Earth.
