= A Floating City =

1871 novel by Jules Verne

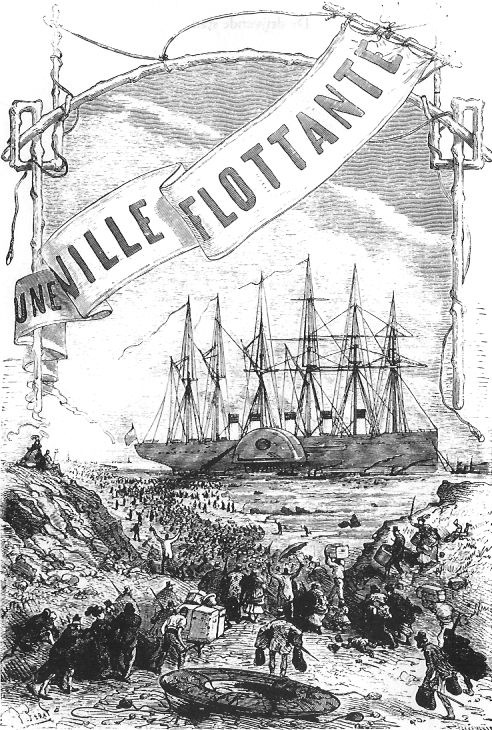
- Author: Jules Verne
- Original title: Une ville flottante
- Illustrator: Jules Férat
- Language: French
- Series: The Extraordinary Voyages #8
- Genre: Adventure novel
- Publisher: Pierre-Jules Hetzel
- Publication date: 1871
- Publication place: France
- English publication date: 1874
- Media type: Print (Hardback)
- Preceded by: Around the Moon
- Followed by: The Adventures of Three Englishmen and Three Russians in South Africa

A Floating City, or sometimes translated The Floating City (French: Une ville flottante), is an adventure novel by French writer Jules Verne first published in 1871 in France. At the time of its publication, the novel enjoyed a similar level of popularity as Around the World in Eighty Days. The first UK and US editions of the novel appeared in 1874. Jules Férat provided the original illustrations for the novel.

== Plot ==
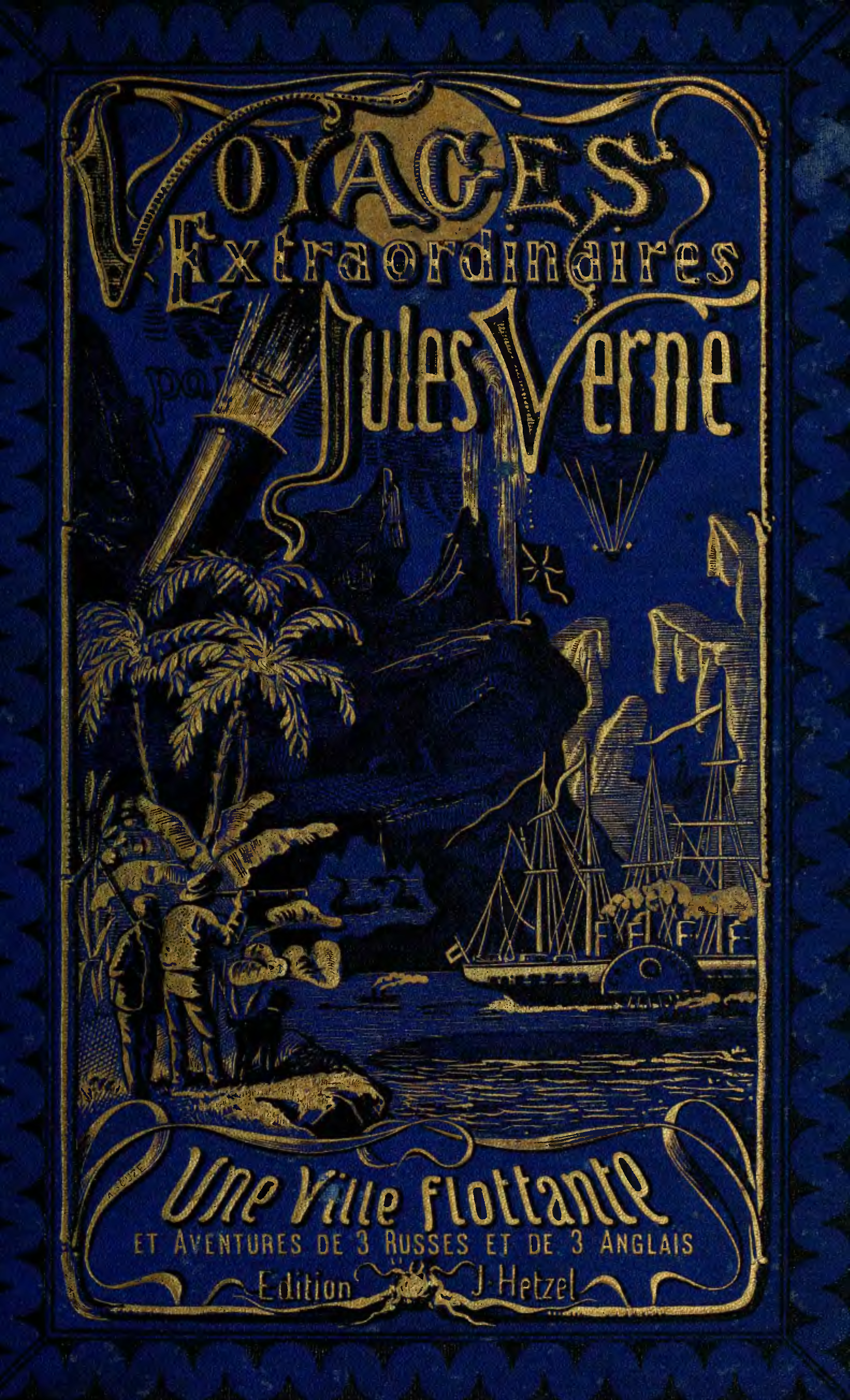
1872 French book cover

It tells of a woman who, on board the ship Great Eastern with her abusive husband, finds that the man she loves is also on board.

As the voyage progresses, life aboard the Great Eastern is depicted in vivid detail, showing the ship as a bustling microcosm of society with its own entertainments and routines. Tensions rise as the narrator’s friend, Captain Fabian Mac Elwin, struggles with the emotional turmoil of seeing his former love, Ellen, trapped in a doomed marriage to her abusive husband. Their fraught relationship culminates in a dramatic confrontation at sea, after which the narrative follows the characters’ attempts to cope with loss and begin anew as the Great Eastern nears its arrival in New York.
