= Musée des familles =

Illustrated French literary magazine (1833–1900)

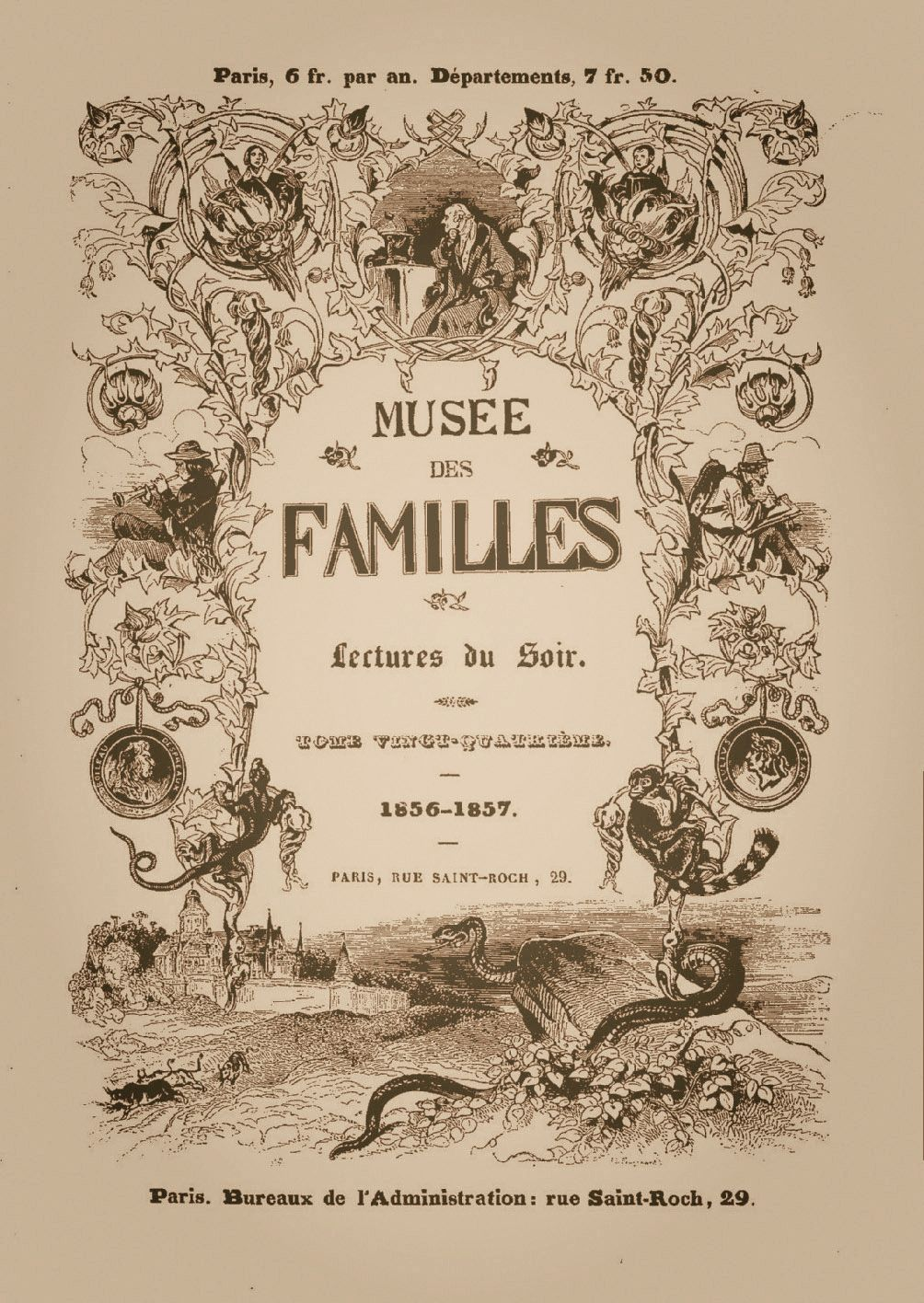
Cover of an 1856–57 issue of Musée des familles

Musée des familles ("Museum of Families") was an illustrated French literary magazine that was published in Paris from 1833 to 1900. It was founded by Émile de Girardin. The magazine was subtitled Lectures du soir ("Readings in the Evening").

Contributors to the magazine included Alexandre Dumas, Théophile Gautier, Jules Verne and Honoré de Balzac.
