= Pierre-Jules Hetzel =

French editor and publisher (1814–1886)

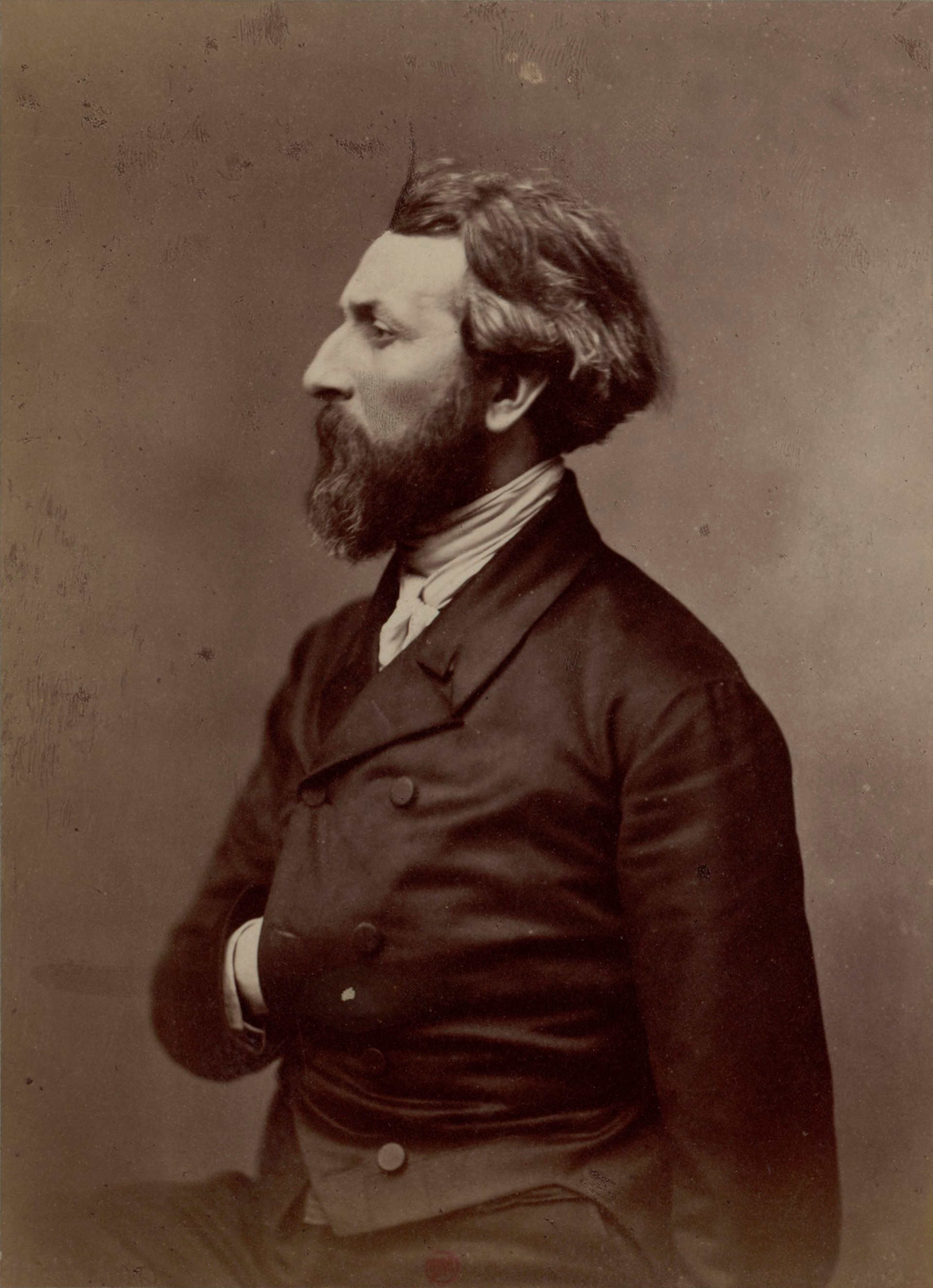
Pierre-Jules Hetzel

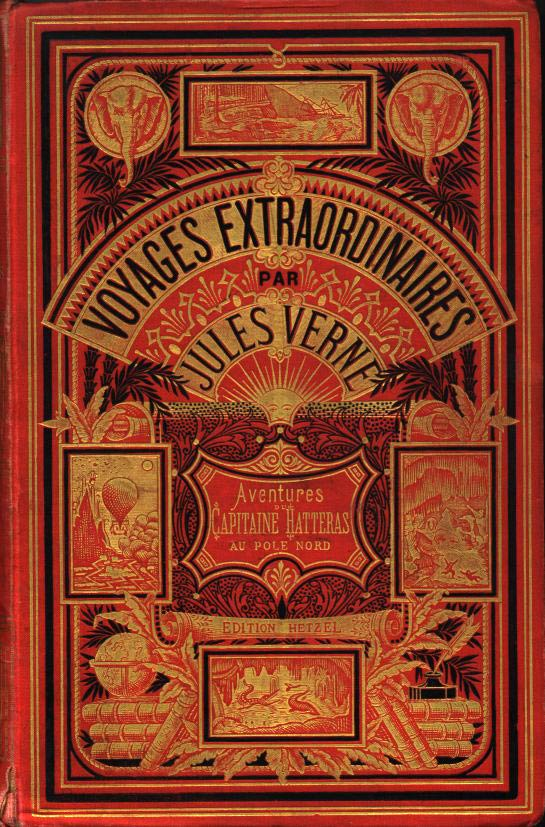
A typical Jules Verne book cover as published by Hetzel. The edition is Les Aventures du Capitaine Hatteras au Pôle Nord, type "Aux deux éléphants".

Pierre-Jules Hetzel (French: [ɛtsɛl]; 15 January 1814 – 17 March 1886) was a French editor and publisher celebrated for his extraordinarily lavishly illustrated editions of Jules Verne's novels, highly prized by collectors.

== Biography ==
Born in Chartres, Eure-et-Loir, Hetzel studied law in Strasbourg, and founded a publishing company in 1837. He was the publisher of Honoré de Balzac, whose Comédie humaine began to appear in 1841, and of Victor Hugo and Émile Zola. In 1843, he founded the Nouveau magazine des enfants ("New Children's Magazine"). Hetzel was a well-known republican, and in 1848 he became chief of cabinet for Alphonse de Lamartine (then minister of Foreign Affairs), and afterward for the minister of the Navy. He went into self-imposed exile in Belgium after the coup d'état which ushered in the Second Empire, and there he continued his political and editorial activities by clandestinely publishing Hugo's Les Châtiments, a harsh pamphlet against the Second Empire.

When the political regime was changed in France, he returned home and published Proudhon and Baudelaire. An important edition of the tales by Charles Perrault, illustrated by Gustave Doré, dates from this period. He founded the Bibliothèque illustrée des Familles ("The Family Illustrated Library"), which was renamed to Le Magasin d'éducation et de récréation ("Education and Entertainment Magazine") in 1864. His goal was to have scientists, authors and illustrators collaborating to create educational works for the whole family.

Hetzel's celebrity comes mostly for his editions of the Voyages extraordinaires ("Extraordinary Journeys") by Jules Verne. The stories were originally published in biweekly chapters as a series in his Magasin. Once all chapters of a story were printed there, the story would appear in book form. Typically this happened towards the end of the year so the books could be purchased as Christmas presents for older children. Originally, there were three editions: one economical, without illustrations; another one in small format, with a few illustrations; and a third one in a bigger in-octavo format and richly illustrated. It is the last edition that became very popular among book collectors.

Hetzel discovered Jules Verne, but scholars still debate to what extent Hetzel "made" Verne, or if it was Verne who "made" Hetzel's publishing career. Each benefited from the other, and their relationship went beyond that of author and publisher.

Hetzel rejected Verne's 1863 manuscript for Paris in the Twentieth Century because he thought it presented a vision of the future that was far too negative and unbelievable for contemporary audiences, though to many modern scholars the story was remarkably accurate in its predictions. Verne locked the manuscript away and no longer wrote futuristic, dystopian stories. Paris in the Twentieth Century was first published in France in 1994.

Hetzel was an atheist. Writing under the pseudonym P.-J. Stahl, he authored many stories for children and young people. He died in Monte Carlo in 1886. After Hetzel's death, the publishing business was directed by his son until purchased by Hachette in 1914.

== See also ==
For more examples of the pictures featured in the books:

- Captain Nemo
- Twenty Thousand Leagues Under the Seas
- Nautilus
