= The Golden Volcano =

Posthumously published novel written by Jules Verne

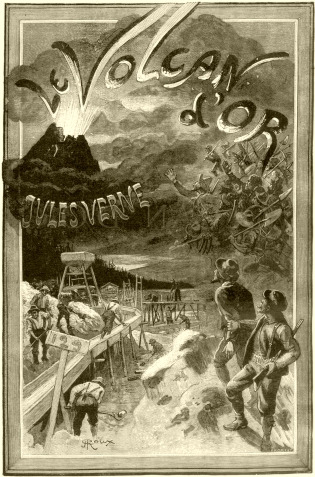
- Cover illustration for the original edition
- Author: Jules Verne
- Original title: Le Volcan d'or
- Illustrator: George Roux
- Language: French
- Series: Voyages Extraordinaires
- Genre: Adventure novel
- Publisher: Pierre-Jules Hetzel
- Publication date: 1906 (Note: For Michel Verne's version)
- Publication place: France
- English publication date: 1962

The Golden Volcano (French: Le Volcan d'or) is a novel by Jules Verne, edited by his son Michel Verne, and published posthumously in 1906.

The story takes place in the middle of the Gold Rush, and features two French-Canadian cousins, who inherit a mining claim on the shores of the Klondike.

== History ==
In 1886, after the death of Pierre-Jules Hetzel, Verne was partially freed from the constraints that had previously been imposed on the content of his novels (both scientific and geographical). He created more original novels with satirical or philosophical tones. In 1896, the shores of the Klondike were inundated with gold seekers. Verne responded to this development since his son, Michel, became involved in prospecting. He was pessimistic about the Gold Rush and regarded gold as the cause of civilization's decline. This thesis is evoked by Verne in some of his other novels, including The Survivors of the "Jonathan", The Chase of the Golden Meteor, and The Castaways of the Flag.

Jules Verne wrote the novel in 1899 but did not publish it, perhaps because of the dark tone of the novel and its unequivocal condemnation of greed, which is in stark contrast with the rest of Verne's Voyages Extraordinaires series. Michel first published it posthumously in 1906, but not before editing it to give it a happy ending that diminished Jules' original purpose but also made its publication possible.

83 years later, in 1989,Société Jules Verne (the Jules Verne Society) published the original manuscript unaltered, thanks to the efforts of Piero Gondolo della Riva.

== Setting ==
It was not uncommon to see some poor emigrant, killed by cold and fatigue, abandoned under the trees...

Without imitating the work of Jack London to describe the beauty and the harshness of the Great North, Verne succeeds in making the reader shiver as the novel describes the snowstorms of Dawson City or the crossing of the Chilkoot Pass. The cities of the Great North are described with all the precision that Verne is known for.

As with Five Weeks in a Balloon, The Children of Captain Grant, and The Mysterious Island, this novel reveals Verne's fascination for extreme natural phenomena. Twice, when wealth corrupts humanity and the two heroes are determined to come to blows (and arms) with rival prospectors, nature intervenes. In the first, an earthquake hits the Forty Miles Creek. In the second, the Golden Volcano explodes. It is as if nature made itself an arbiter who decided to send the protagonists home, punishing the wicked and chastising the innocent.

== Plot ==
=== Original ===
Summy Skim and Ben Raddle, residents of Montreal, Canada, are unexpectedly bequeathed a mining claim in the Klondike, Yukon. Thus, they the join the Gold Rush, only to encounter disaster, disease, extreme weather, and murderous rival prospectors – Malone and Hunter. Just as they are about to come to armed conflict, an earthquake strikes and the region is flooded. Ben is suffering from a disease and a broken leg, so Summy and their guide, Bill Stell, take the unfortunate man to the hospital, where he is healed a few months later.

On the way out to a hunt, Summy, Bill, and their trusted Indian, Néluto, discover a dying man lying under a tree. They deliver him back to the hospital, where he dies a few days later. Before dying, however, he speaks of a volcano of pure gold. The cousins and their guides organize an expedition for the golden volcano. The golden volcano, however, also attracts their rival Malone and his forces.

Summy's group forces the volcano to erupt by redirecting a nearby river into a hole they bore into the volcano. The plan succeeds; the villains, having made their way to the top of the mountain, are immediately forced down by the eruption. Summy shoots Hunter and Malone. However, the volcano erupts into the sea, causing Summy and Ben to leave with less money than they came with.

=== Michel Verne's changes ===
Michel Verne's version replaces the two nuns (Sisters Martha and Madeleine) with two prospector cousins (Jane and Edith Edgerton) both 22 years old. A lighter character is created in the cousins' servant, while the taciturn expert, Néluto, becomes more of a negative caricature of Indians. Most important of all, the heroes do not return from their journey empty-handed. Far from it, they grow rich, and the story ends in a double wedding. This change effectively subverts Jules Verne's message on the evils of the gold and greed.

== Characters ==
The following characters appear in the original, unaltered version, which did not appear until 1989:

- Summy Skim, French-Canadian, 32 years old; a landowner and skilled hunter who owns a dog called "Stop"!
- Ben Raddle, Summy Skim's first cousin, 34 years old; an engineer
- Josias Lacoste, uncle of Summy Skim and Ben Raddle; an adventurer and prospector, he left them a claim in the Klondike when he died
- Mr. Snubbin, a notary in Montreal; Canadian by birth. He is the successor of Master Nick (Nicolas Sagamore), one of the characters in Family Without a Name.
- Captain Healy, president of the Anglo-American syndicate Transportation and Trading Co. in Dawson City
- Hunter, a rough-looking, half-American, half-Spanish adventurer from Texas
- Malone, Hunter's companion, with a similar look and background to him
- Boyen, a Norwegian prospector from Christiana; a peaceful man
- Sister Martha, of the Congregation of the Sisters of Mercy; of French-Canadian origin; 32 years old
- Sister Madeleine, her companion; of the same order and origin; 20 years old.
- Bill Stell, Canadian, former scout and scout for the Dominion troops; now a convoy man and leader of an experienced staff; 50 years old
- Néluto, a member of Bill Stell's staff, pilot, Klondike Indian, age 40; previously served as a guide to Hudson's Bay Company fur traders
- Doctor Pilcox, Anglo-Canadian, about 40 years old; physician, surgeon, apothecary, and dentist of Dawson City
- William Broll, deputy director of the Anglo-American syndicate Transportation and Trading Co.
- Major James Walsh, Commissioner General of the Yukon Territories; about 50 years old
- Lorique, foreman in the service of Josias Lacoste and then of Ben Raddle; French-Canadian, about 40 years old
- Jacques Laurier, French prospector, 42 years old, born in Nantes; found half-dead by Summy Skim, but before he dies, he gives Ben Raddle the location of the "Golden Mount"
- Harry Brown, Anglo-Canadian prospector and partner of Jacques Laurier
- Krasak, an Alaskan Indian, about 40 years old, with a fierce face; Hunter and Malone's cellmate

Michel Verne effected the following changes in his edition, which was published in 1906 (83 years earlier):

- Jane and Edith Edgerton, The 22-years-old prospector cousins, replace the two nuns from the original work.
- Patrick Richardson is added. He is an Irish blacksmith, six feet tall, and crazy. Jane Edgerton takes him into her service.
- Néluto, the ever-perceptive Indian in the original manuscript, gives evasive answers in this version.
- Jacques Laurier, the French prospector, is renamed Ledun for no apparent reason. Olivier Dumas suspects that Jules Verne created Jacques Laurier to make Michel, who was busy chasing his fortune, give up. Indeed, both "Laurier" and "Verne" are French word for trees. Michel must have understood his father's allusion and thus changed the character's name.
