= The Carpathian Castle =

1892 gothic novel by Jules Verne

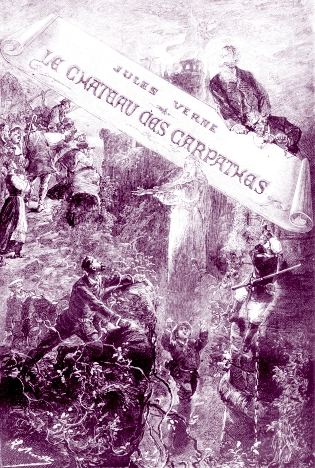
- Author: Jules Verne
- Original title: Le Château des Carpathes
- Illustrator: Léon Benett
- Language: French
- Series: The Extraordinary Voyages #37
- Genre: Gothic; horror; science fiction
- Publisher: Pierre-Jules Hetzel
- Publication date: 1892
- Publication place: France
- English publication date: 1893
- Media type: Print (Hardback)
- Preceded by: Mistress Branican
- Followed by: Claudius Bombarnac

The Carpathian Castle (French: Le Château des Carpathes) is a Gothic novel by Jules Verne first published in 1892. It is possible that Bram Stoker took inspiration from this for his 1897 novel Dracula. Due to castle aspect and local toponymy, it is assumed that Colț Castle in Hunedoara county inspired Jules Verne. Probable inspiration for Verne was his extended stay in Bratislava and the Devín castle in present day Slovakia, where he also wrote his novel The Danube Pilot.

== Title ==
The original French title was Le Château des Carpathes, and in English there are some alternate titles, such as The Castle of the Carpathians, The Castle in Transylvania, and Rodolphe de Gortz; or the Castle of the Carpathians.

== Synopsis ==
In the village of Werst in the Carpathian Mountains of Transylvania (in the then Austria-Hungary), some mysterious things are occurring and the villagers believe that Chort (the devil) occupies the castle. A visitor to the region, Count Franz de Telek, is intrigued by the stories and decides to go to the castle and investigate. He finds that the owner of the castle is Baron Rodolphe de Gortz, with whom he is acquainted; years earlier, they were rivals for the affections of the celebrated Italian prima donna La Stilla. The Count thought that La Stilla was dead, but he sees her image and hears her voice coming from the castle. It is later revealed that it was only a projected still image accompanying a high-quality phonograph recording.

== In the media ==
- The 1981 Czechoslovak comedy feature film The Mysterious Castle in the Carpathians is based on this novel.
- In 2026, Edward Ferdinand’s opera Karpatia, based on a story by Jules Verne, premiered in the Netherlands, performed by Operakwartier, the opera ensemble of Muziekschool Zeeland, led by Johanna and Edward Ferdinand.
