= Propeller Island =

1895 novel by Jules Verne

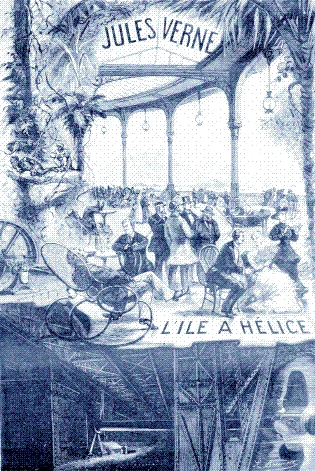
- Author: Jules Verne
- Original title: L'Île à hélice
- Translator: William John Gordon
- Illustrator: Léon Benett
- Language: French
- Series: The Extraordinary Voyages #41
- Genre: Adventure novel, Science fiction
- Publisher: Pierre-Jules Hetzel
- Publication date: 1895
- Publication place: France
- English publication date: 1896
- Media type: Print
- Preceded by: Captain Antifer
- Followed by: Facing the Flag

Propeller Island (French: L'Île à hélice) (also published as The Floating Island, or The Pearl of the Pacific, and as The Self-Propelled Island) is a science fiction novel by French author Jules Verne (1828–1905). It was first published in 1895 as part of the Voyages Extraordinaires. It relates the adventures of a French string quartet in Milliard City, a city on a massive ship in the Pacific Ocean, inhabited entirely by millionaires.

== Plot ==
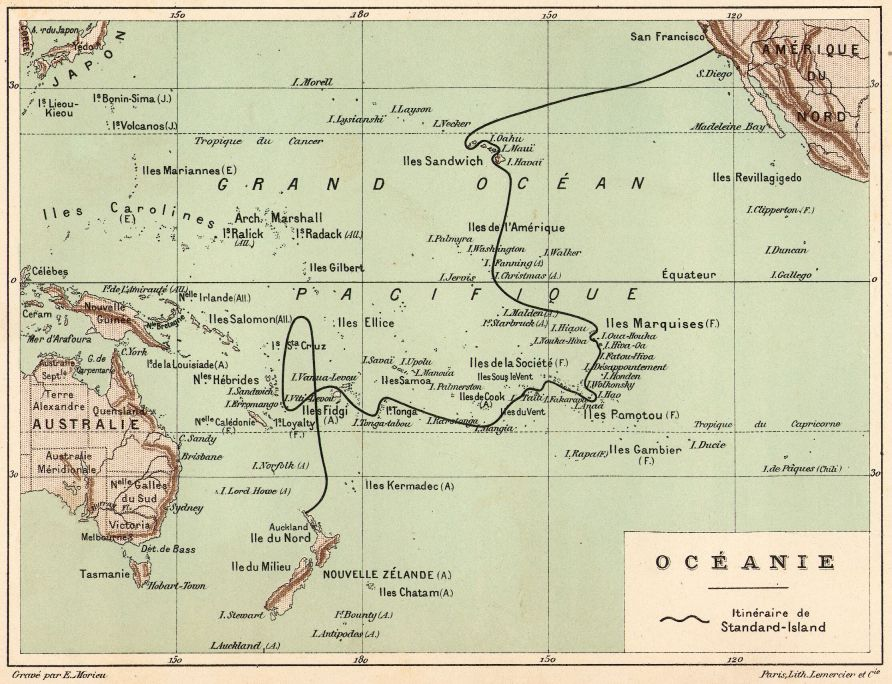

A French string quartet (Sébastien Zorn, Frascolin, Yvernes and Pinchinat), traveling from San Francisco to their next engagement in San Diego, is diverted to Standard Island.

There is also a comic interlude when they arrive at night and are being ignored after playing good music. So they intentionally play out of tune, getting an immediate response.

Standard Island is an immense man-made island designed to travel the waters of the Pacific Ocean. The wealth of residents of the island can only be measured in millions. The quartet is hired to play a number of concerts for the residents during their tour of the islands (Sandwich, Cook, Society) of the South Pacific.

The island seems an idyllic paradise; however, it is an island pulled between two factions. The left half's population is led by Jem Tankerdon and is known as the Larboardites. The right half's population is led by Nat Coverley and is known as the Starboardites.

The company that created the island goes bankrupt, but the rich individuals on board buy it out. And initially they continue to accept the leadership of the man appointed by the company.

Various obstacles encountered on their journey, But things get serious when the original commander is killed, and the two faction leaders each want to succeed. They try to coopt a former king as a compromise candidate, but he refuses. This threatens the future of the island itself.

== English versions ==
In October, 1896, Sampson Low (London) published the novel as The Floating Island, or The Pearl of the Pacific, translated by W. J. Gordon, with 80 illustrations. While Gordon was an accomplished translator, boy's author, and literary figure with an accurate translation of Verne's The Giant Raft to his credit, the dark social commentary of Propeller Island did not sit well with his publishers, and numerous alterations in the text were made. As Arthur B. Evans notes:

The equivalent of dozens of pages have been cut from this Verne story because they were viewed as being somehow critical of the Americans or the British. Such unacceptable passages included a description of the United States doubling its size by annexing Canada and Central America (I§1), a short blurb making fun of England’s refusal to adopt the metric system (I§5), several very anti-American paragraphs focusing on the colonial history of Hawaii (I§9), a discussion about corrupt British politics (I§13), a few paragraphs concerning the lack of manners of many British citizens (II§1), a lengthy discussion where the British are condemned for introducing snakes onto the islands of Martinique and Guadeloupe before handing them over to the French (II§6), and a comical dialogue comparing the British to cannibals (II§9). Sometimes such changes, though distressing, can be inadvertently humorous. In one problematic passage—a long anti-missionary diatribe that the translator apparently decided could not be easily cut from Verne’s narrative—a simple but ingenious solution was found: the nationality of the rapacious cleric was simply changed from British to German (II§1.190)."

Gordon's translation was also used for the only fully illustrated American edition of the book, published in November 1897 by W. L. Allison. Other publishers were Hurst and Company and the Donahue Brothers.

In 1967 Sidgwick and Jackson (London) published an abbreviated version of the work in the Fitzroy Edition as Propellor Island. In 1990, Keegan Paul (US) republished the Allison edition of The Floating Island without illustrations and with an introduction by Kaori O'Connor.

In 2015, Professor Marie-Thérèse Noiset of the University of North Carolina translated the book complete with the previously excised passages. Unusually, Verne's original was written in the present tense, but Noiset's release delivered the story in the past tense, which is the most common narrative time used in the writing of fiction. She explained, "In order for my translation to read smoothly, the Pacific Islands encountered in the novel have been given their present-day names, the measurements given by Verne have been converted from the metric system to the English system, and the narration has been translated into the past tense." Michael Orthofer critiqued the edition at his Complete Review website, writing that the original was "apparently one of the first examples of a novel written in the third-person and the present tense – yet surely these should count as additional reasons to try to recreate that in English..." Professor Arthur Bruce Evans of DePauw University reviewed the Noiset translation favorably, describing her prose as an example of "[t]he fine art of translating—blending textual faithfulness with discursive fluidity..." Evans noted the "regrettable lack of illustrations" in the 2015 edition, as compared to the Verne octavo which held approximately 80 illustrations by Léon Benett.

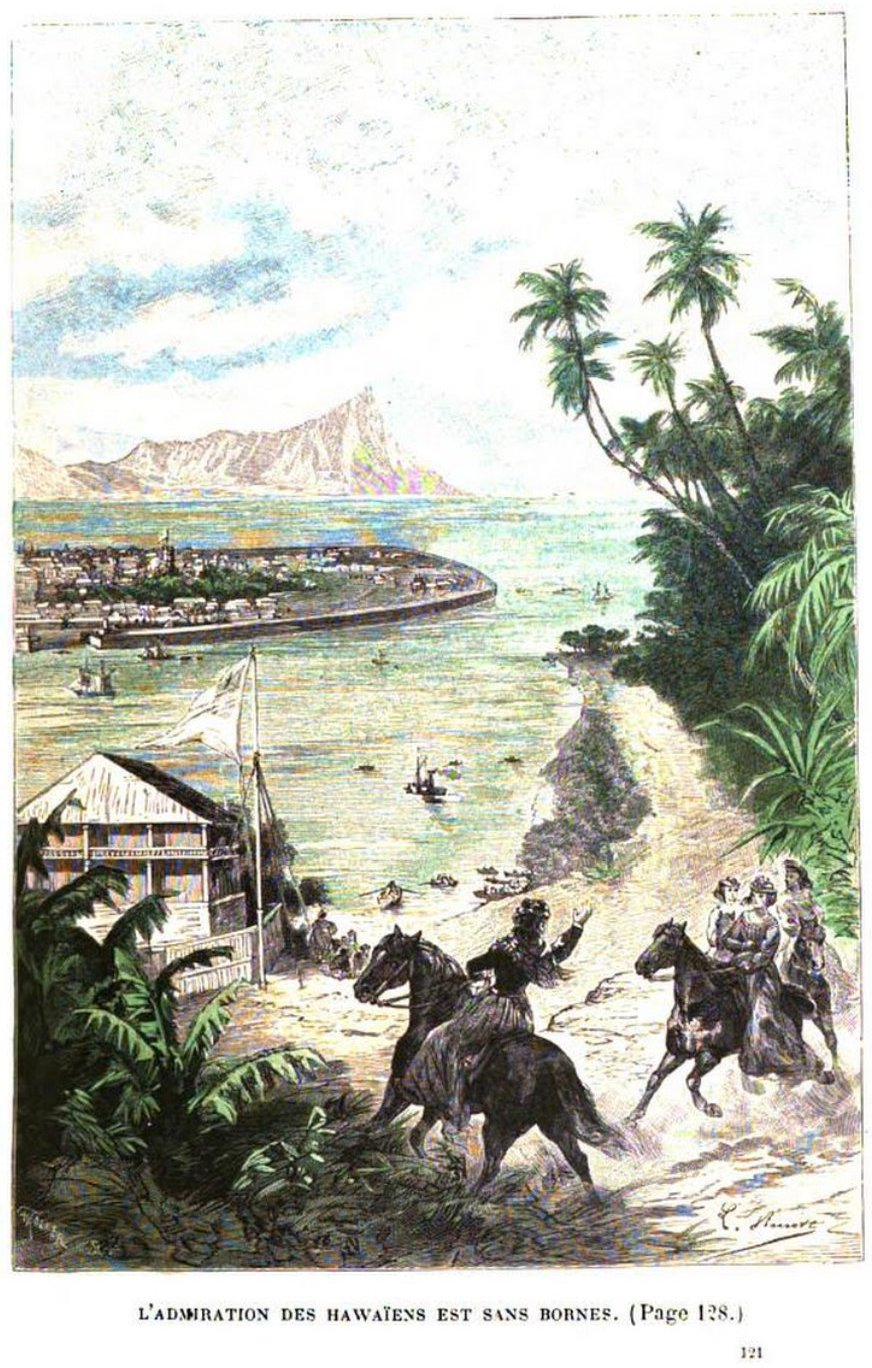
Léon Benett created about 80 engravings for the book. This one shows the man-made island approaching Hawaii.

== See also ==
- 1895 in science fiction
- Leviathan
