= Yesterday and Tomorrow =

1910 collection of short stories by Jules Verne

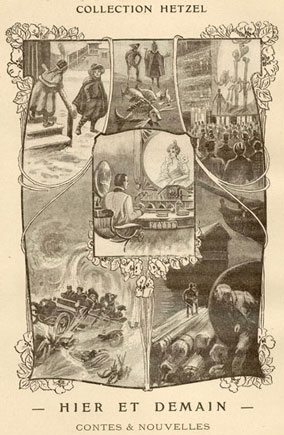
- Author: Jules Verne
- Original title: Hier et Demain
- Language: French
- Series: Voyages Extraordinaires
- Genre: Short stories
- Publisher: Pierre-Jules Hetzel
- Publication date: 1910
- Publication place: France
- English publication date: 1965
- Media type: Print

Yesterday and Tomorrow (French: Hier et Demain) is a posthumous collection of short stories by Jules Verne, first published in 1910 by Louis-Jules Hetzel.

The stories in the original French edition were edited and/or modified by the author's son, Michel Verne.

== Contents ==
The stories in the original French edition (Hier et Demain) include:

- La Famille Raton (The Rat family)
- M. Ré-Dièze et Mlle Mi-Bémol (Mr Ray Sharp and Miss Me Flatt)
- La Destinée de Jean Morénas (The Sombre Fate of Jean Morenas)
- Le Humbug (The Humbug)
- La Journée d’un journaliste américain en 2889 (In the Twentieth Century: the Day of an American Journalist in 2889)
- L’Éternel Adam (The Eternal Adam)

In the English editions of this book (Yesterday and Tomorrow), a different set of titles are present:

- The Eternal Adam
- The Fate of Jean Morenas
- An Ideal City (added)
- Ten Hours Hunting (added)
- Frritt-Flacc (added)
- Gil Braltar (added)
- In the Twentieth Century: the Day of an American Journalist in 2889
- Mr. Ray Sharp and Miss Me Flat

In the introduction to the English edition, editor I. O. Evans said that he chose replace two stories as they were "lacking in general interest". He described the first omitted story, "La Famille Raton", as "so absurdly fantastic that one cannot be certain whether Verne meant it seriously'" and said that "Le Humbug" required "no translation".
