= Kéraban the Inflexible =

1883 novel by Jules Verne

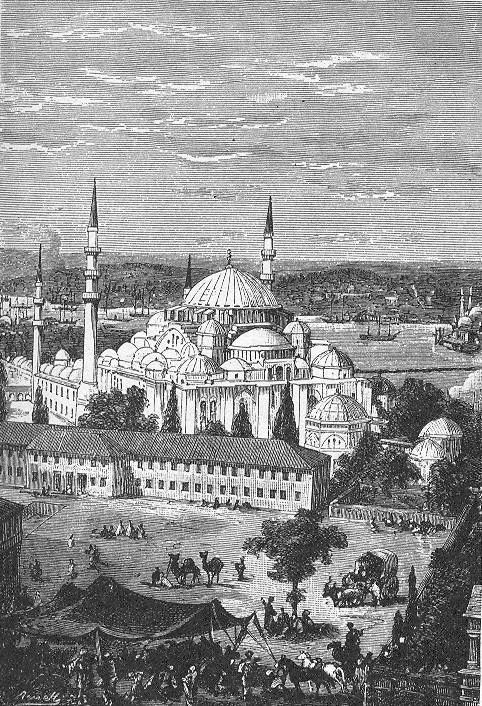
- An illustration from Kéraban the Inflexible painted by Léon Benett
- Author: Jules Verne
- Original title: Kéraban-le-têtu
- Illustrator: Léon Benett
- Language: French
- Series: The Extraordinary Voyages #24
- Genre: Adventure novel
- Publisher: Pierre-Jules Hetzel
- Publication date: 1883
- Publication place: France
- English publication date: 1883-1884
- Media type: Print (Hardback)
- Preceded by: The Green Ray
- Followed by: The Vanished Diamond

Kéraban the Inflexible (French: Kéraban-le-têtu, 1883) is an adventure novel written by Jules Verne.

== Synopsis ==
Jan van Mitten and his valet Bruno (both of Rotterdam, Holland) are in Istanbul, Turkey. The pair are going to meet with Van Mitten's tobacco business associate, a headstrong man named Kéraban. At Van Mitten's meeting, Kéraban decides to take them to dinner at his home in Scutari, on the other side of the Bosphorus Strait. Just before they are going to cross the Strait, a tax is imposed on all vessels that can be used to cross the strait.

Enraged by this new tax, Kéraban decides to take his associates to Scutari by traveling seven hundred leagues around the perimeter of the Black Sea, so that he won't have to pay the paltry ten para tax. The principled Kéraban and his reluctant traveling companions begin the journey; the only deadline for Kéraban is that he must be back in six weeks time, so that he may depart in time to arrange for his nephew's wedding to a young woman, who must be married before she turns seventeen. If she doesn't meet that deadline, she won't inherit 100,000 Turkish pounds.

Unfortunately for Kéraban and friends, the villains Yarhud, Scarpante, and the man they work for, Seigneur Saffar, have plans to ensure that the young woman marries Saffar instead before the deadline.

== Publication history ==
- 1883-1884 USA: New York, G. Munro, published as The Headstrong Turk
- 1887, UK, London: Sampson Low, Marston, Searle, & Rivington, 1887. First UK edition. Published in two volumes: The Captain of the Guidara and Scarpante the Spy
