= The Green Ray =

1882 novel by Jules Verne

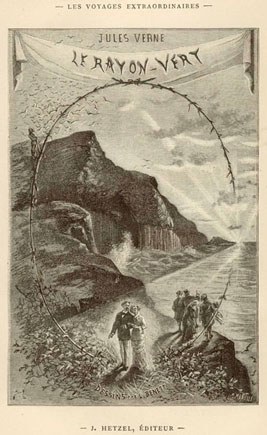
- Author: Jules Verne
- Original title: Le Rayon vert
- Illustrator: Léon Benett
- Language: French
- Series: The Extraordinary Voyages #23
- Genre: Adventure novel, Science fiction
- Publisher: Pierre-Jules Hetzel
- Publication date: 1882
- Publication place: France
- English publication date: 1883
- Media type: Print (Hardback)
- Pages: 128
- ISBN: 1-59224-035-6
- OCLC: 53822776
- Preceded by: Godfrey Morgan
- Followed by: Kéraban the Inflexible

The Green Ray (French: Le Rayon vert) is an adventure novel by the French writer Jules Verne published in 1882 and named after the optical phenomenon of the same name. It is referenced in a 1986 film of the same name by Eric Rohmer.

== Plot summary ==
Brothers Samuel and Sebastian Melville want to marry their niece Helena Campbell off to the hilariously awful scientist Aristobulus Ursicles. Verne has fabricated the ancient Scottish legend of the Green Ray, a flash of green light that sometimes appears just as the sun is passing the horizon at sea when the sky is clear, and the viewer is enabled to see closely into his own heart and read the hearts of others. After reading a newspaper article about it, Helena refuses to marry until she sees this optical phenomenon. They all with their servants then travel to the west coast of Scotland and the Hebrides. There they meet the artist Oliver Sinclair, with whom Helena falls in love. Many opportunities to see the Green Ray are thwarted at the last moment, usually inappropriately by Aristobulus. Eventually the Green Ray is seen by the brothers and servants. Helena and Oliver miss the phenomenon when they look into each other's eyes.

== Main characters ==
- Miss Helena Campbell - principal character, beautiful eighteen years old girl with blue eyes and fair hair
- Elizabeth, aka Dame Bess - Melvill's housekeeper
- Master MacFyne - proprietor of the hotel Caledonian in Oban
- Samuel Melvill, aka uncle Sam
- Sébastian Melvill, aka uncle Sib
- Baillie Patrick Oldimer - Olivier's uncle
- John Olduck - skipper of the yawl Clorinda
- Partridge - servant
- Olivier Sinclair - educated twenty years old artist
- Aristobulus Ursiclos - scientist graduate of the universities of Oxford and Edinburgh

== Publication history in English ==
- 1883, New York: Munro, translated by James Cotterell as The Green Ray
- 1883, London: Sampson Low, translated by Mary de Hautville as The Green Ray
- 1965, London: Arco/Westport, CT: Associated Booksellers, Fitzroy Edition, abridged and edited by I. O. Evans as Green Ray & The Blockade Runners
- 2003, Holicong, PA: Wildside Press as The Green Ray
- 2009, Edinburgh: Luath Press, ISBN 978-1-905222-12-4, translated by Karen Loukes as The Green Ray

== Illustration from the book ==
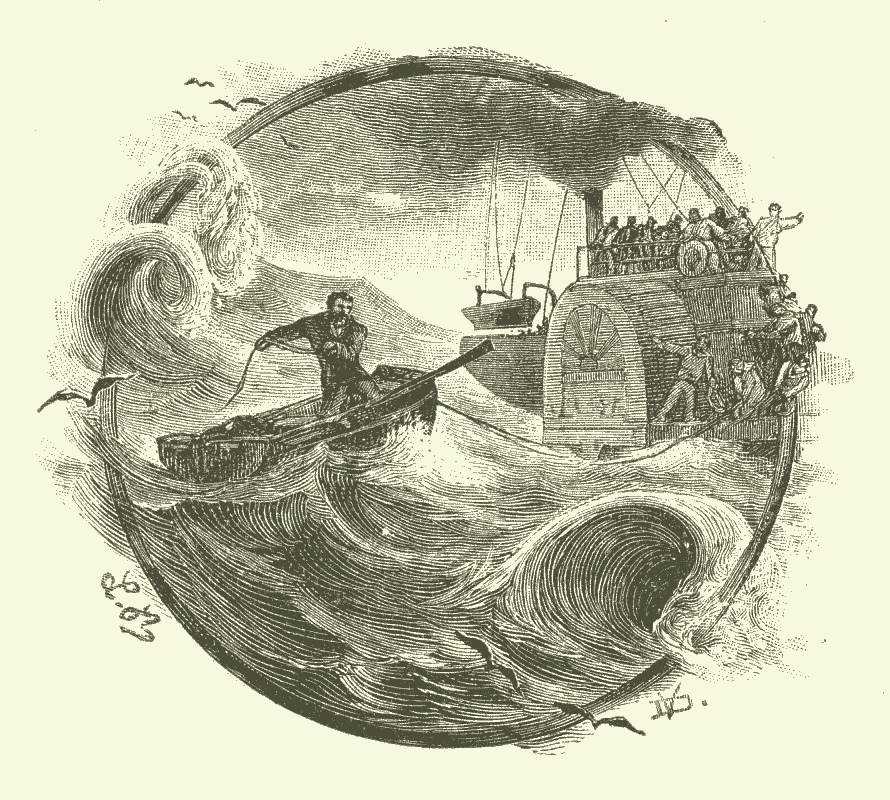

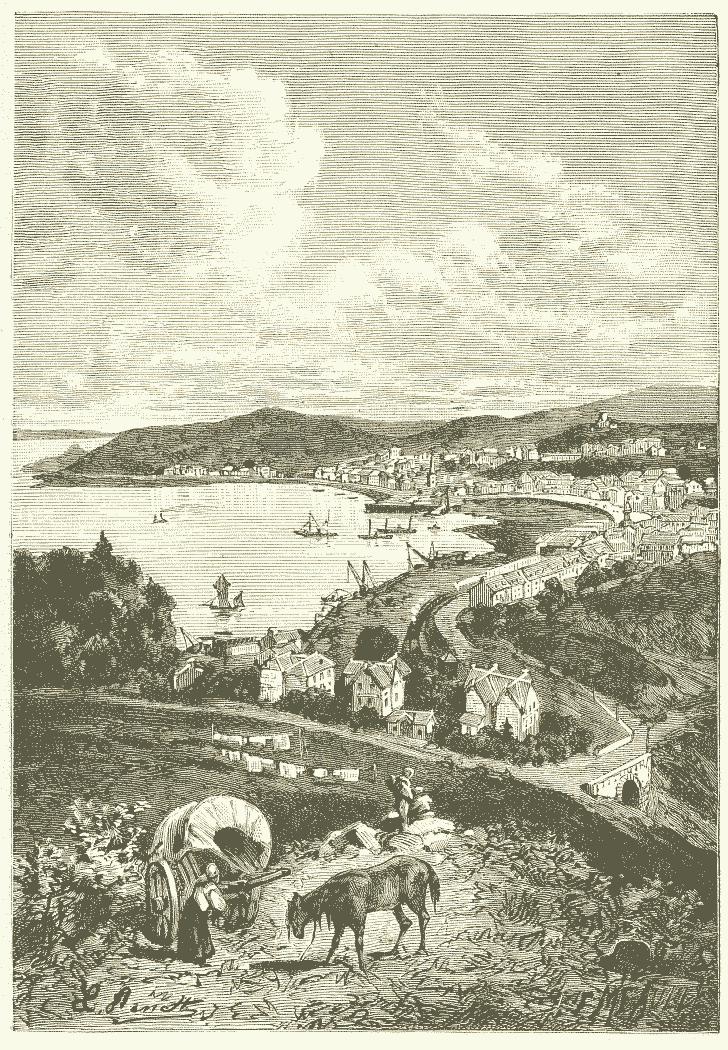

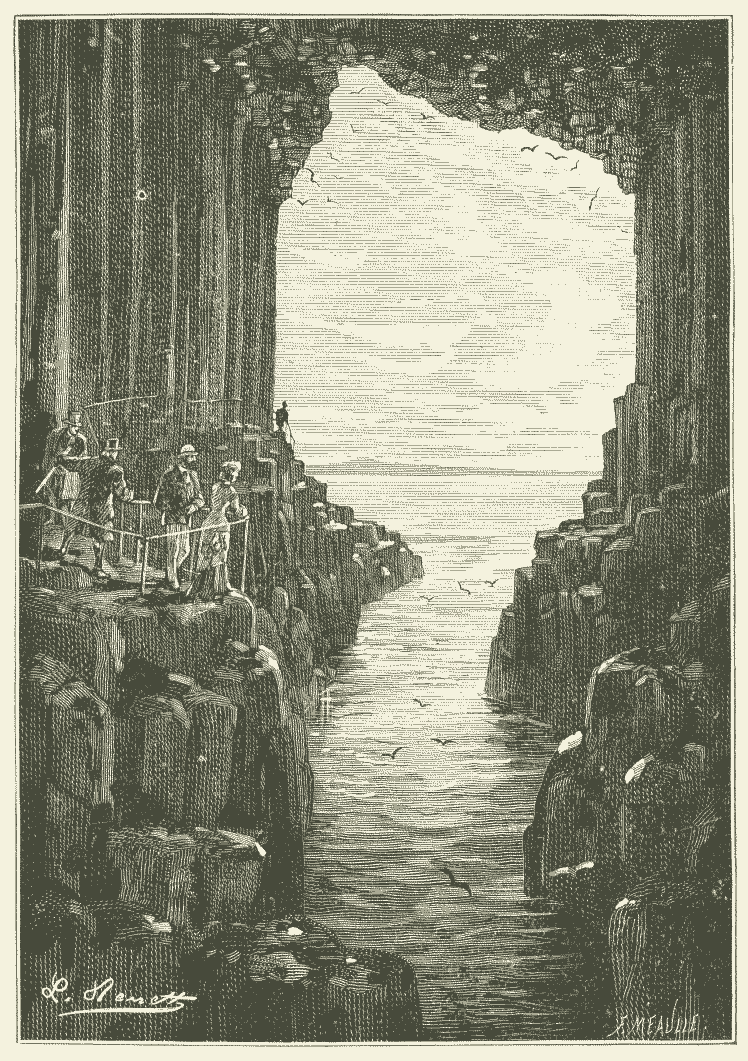
