= Claudius Bombarnac =

1893 novel by Jules Verne

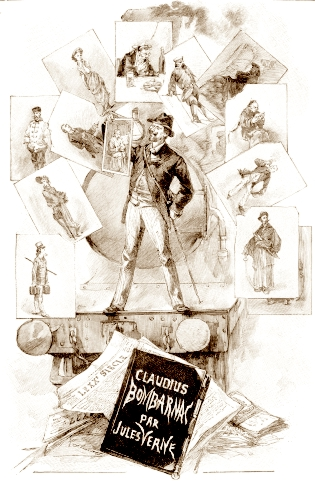
- Author: Jules Verne
- Original title: Claudius Bombarnac
- Illustrator: Léon Benett
- Language: French
- Series: The Extraordinary Voyages #38
- Genre: Adventure novel, Science fiction
- Publisher: Pierre-Jules Hetzel
- Publication date: 1893
- Publication place: France
- English publication date: 1894
- Media type: Print (Hardback)
- Preceded by: Carpathian Castle
- Followed by: Foundling Mick

Claudius Bombarnac (French: Claudius Bombarnac, 1893) is an adventure novel written by Jules Verne.

== Plot ==
Claudius Bombarnac, a reporter is assigned by the Twentieth Century to cover the travels of the Grand Transasiatic Railway which runs between Uzun Ada, a harbour on the eastern coast of the Caspian Sea, and Peking, China. Accompanying him on this journey is an interesting collection of characters, including one who is trying to beat the round the world record and another who is a stowaway. Claudius hopes one of them will become the hero of his piece, so his story won't be just a boring travelogue. He is not disappointed when a special car guarded by troops is added to the train, said to be carrying the remains of a great Mandarin. The great Mandarin actually turns out to be a large consignment being returned to China from Persia. Unfortunately the train must travel through a large part of China that is controlled by unscrupulous robber-chiefs. Before the journey is over, Claudius finds his hero.

== English titles ==
In addition to Claudius Bombarnac, the novel has been published under several different English titles:

- The Special Correspondent
- The Adventures of a Special Correspondent
- The Adventures of a Special Correspondent in Central Asia
- Claudius Bombarnac: Special Correspondent
Journey across Asia, drawings by Léon Benett

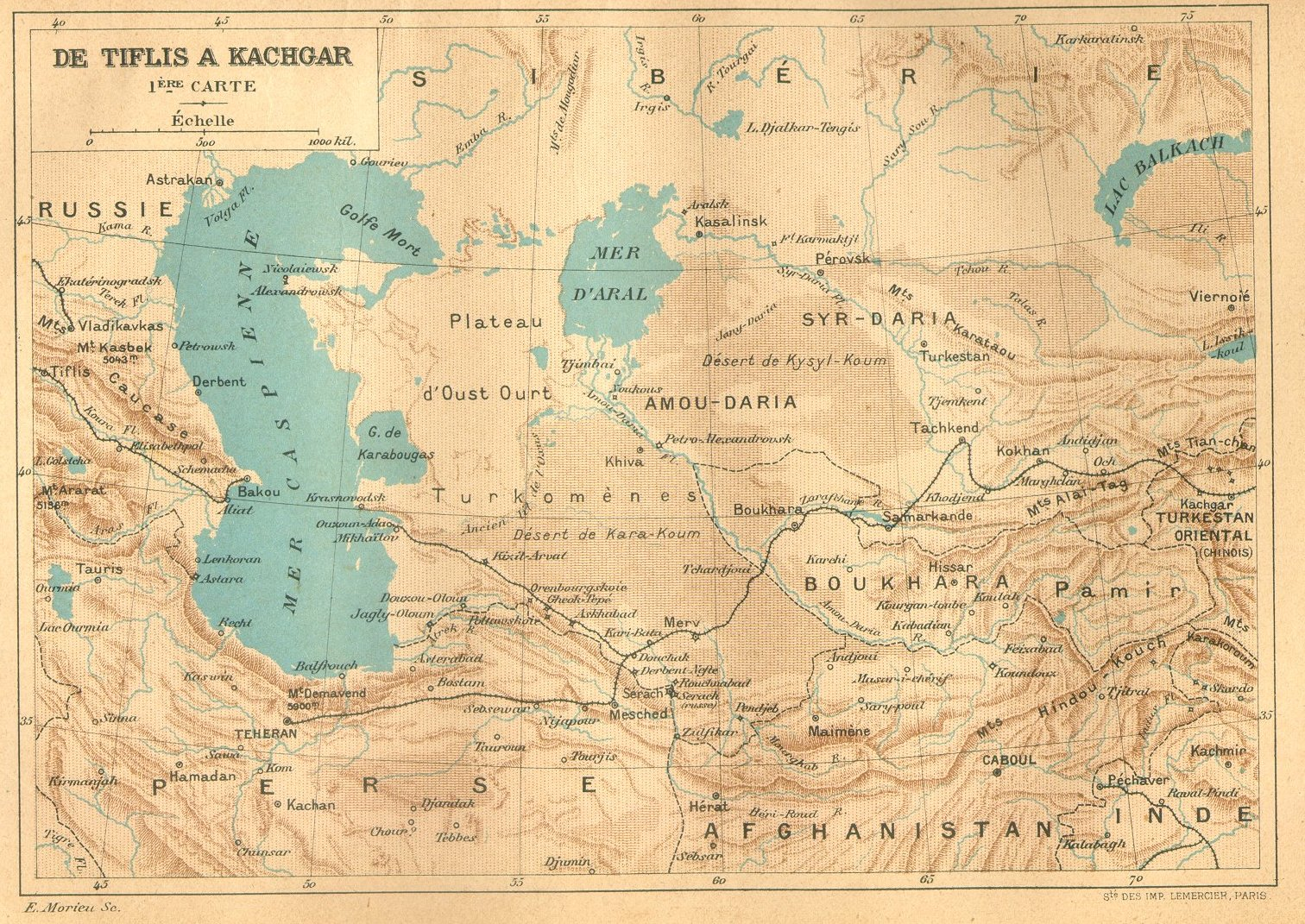
De Tiflis à Kachgar, first map

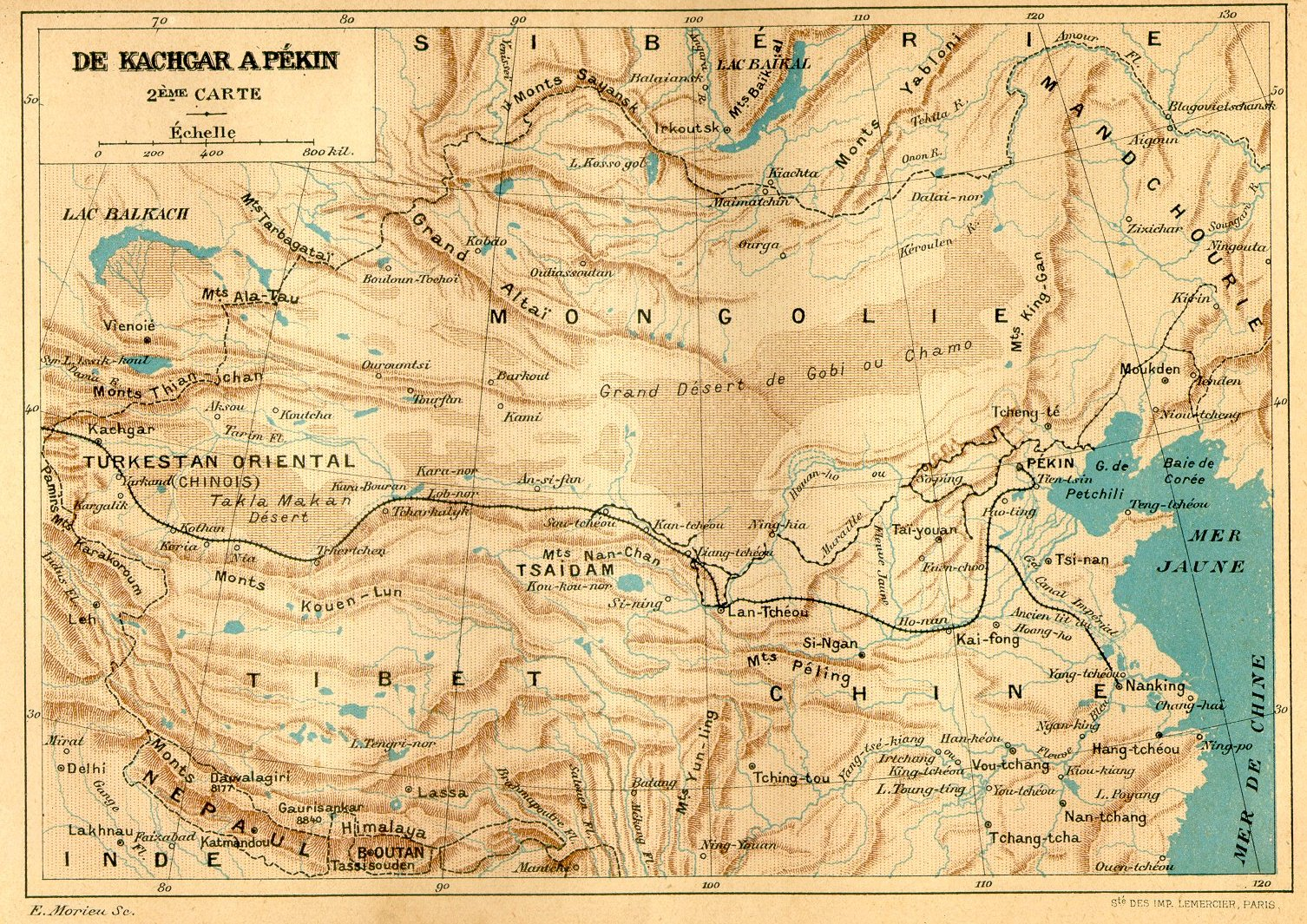
De Kachgar à Pékin, second map

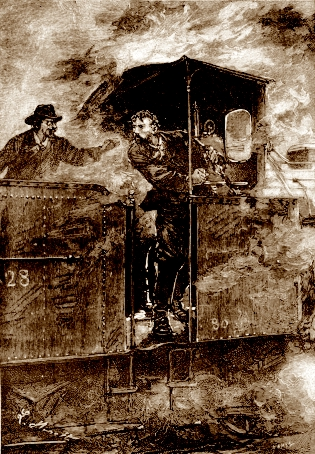
An illustration from Jules Verne's novel

== Publication history ==
- 1894, UK, London: Sampson Low. 279 pp., First UK edition
- 1894, US, New York: Lovell, Coryell and Co., 279 pp., First United States edition, as The Special Correspondent, or The Adventures of Claudius Bombarnac
