= The Purchase of the North Pole =

1889 novel by Jules Verne

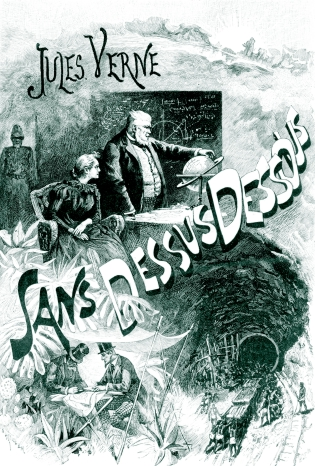
- Author: Jules Verne
- Original title: Sans dessus dessous
- Illustrator: Georges Roux
- Language: French
- Series: The Extraordinary Voyages #34; Baltimore Gun Club #3
- Genre: Adventure novel, science fiction
- Publisher: Pierre-Jules Hetzel
- Publication date: 1889
- Publication place: France
- English publication date: 1890
- Media type: Print (Hardback)
- Preceded by: Family Without a Name
- Followed by: César Cascabel

The Purchase of the North Pole or Topsy-Turvy (French: Sans dessus dessous) is an adventure novel by Jules Verne, published in 1889. It is the third and last novel of the Baltimore Gun Club, first appearing in From the Earth to the Moon, and later in Around the Moon, featuring the same characters but set twenty years later.

Like some other books of his later years, in this novel Verne tempers his love of science and engineering with a good dose of irony about their potential for harmful abuse and the fallibility of human endeavors.

== Plot ==
In an unspecified year in the 1890s (written "189–" in the novel), an international auction is organized to define the sovereign rights to the part of the Arctic extending from the 84th parallel, the highest yet reached by man, to the North Pole. Several countries send their official delegates, but the auction is won by a representative from an anonymous United States buyer.

After the auction closes, the mysterious buyer is revealed to be Barbicane and Co., a company founded by Impey Barbicane, J.T. Maston and Captain Nicholl — the same members of the Baltimore Gun Club who, twenty years earlier, had traveled around the Moon inside a large cannon shell. The gunmen-astronauts had come out of their retirement with an even more ambitious engineering project: using the recoil of a huge cannon to remove the tilt of the Earth's axis — so that it would become perpendicular to the planet's orbit, like Jupiter's.

That change would bring an end to seasons, as day and night would always be equal and each place would have the same climate all year round. The society's interest lay in another effect of the recoil: a displacement of the Earth's rotation axis, which would bring the lands around the North Pole, which they had secured in the auction, to latitude 67 north. Then the vast coal deposits that were conjectured to exist under the ice could be easily mined and sold. The technical feasibility of the plan had been confirmed by J. T. Maston's computations. The necessary capital had been provided by Ms. Evangelina Scorbitt, a wealthy widow and ardent admirer of Maston.

The cannon needed for that plan would be enormous, much larger than the huge Columbiad that had sent them to the Moon. Once the plan became public, the brilliant French engineer Alcide Pierdeux quickly computes the required force of the explosion. He then discovers that the recoil would buckle the Earth's crust; many countries (mostly in Asia) would be flooded, while others (including the United States) would gain new land.

Alcide's note sends the world into panic and rage, and authorities promptly rush to stop the project. However Barbicane and Nicholl had left America for a destination unknown, to supervise the completion and firing of the monster gun. J. T. Maston is caught and jailed, but he is unwilling or unable to reveal the cannon's location. Frantic searches around the world fail to find it either.

The cannon in fact had been dug deep into the flanks of Mount Kilimanjaro, by a small army of workers provided by a local sultan who was an enthusiastic fan of the former Moon explorers. The projectile, a steel-braced chunk of rock weighing 180,000 tons, would exit the barrel at the fantastic speed of 2,800 kilometres per second — thanks to a new powerful explosive invented by Nicholl, which he had called "melimelonite".

The cannon is fired as planned, and the explosion causes huge damage in the immediate vicinity. However, the Earth's axis retains its tilt and position, and not the slightest tremor is felt in the rest of the world. Alcide, shortly before the cannon was fired, had discovered that J. T. Maston, while computing the size of the cannon, had made a calculation error; he had accidentally erased three zeros from the blackboard when he was struck by lightning during a telephone call from Ms. Scorbitt. Because of that single mistake, twelve zeros got omitted from the result. Because Maston's calculations were undoubtedly considered correct when they were discovered, this error was not discovered early enough. The cannon he designed was indeed far too small: a trillion of them would have had to be fired to achieve the intended effect.

Ridiculed by the whole world and bearing the bitter resentment of his two associates, J. T. Maston goes back into retirement, vowing to never again make any mathematical calculations. Ms. Scorbitt finally declares her feelings to Maston, and he gladly surrenders to marriage. Alcide gains worldwide recognition by revealing the cause of the failure of the operation to the public.

== Trivia ==
- The notion of tilting the Earth's axis to affect the climate is first put forward by J.T. Maston in From the Earth to the Moon.
- The fancy name "melimelonite", based on the French word for 'mishmash', "méli-mélo", may be a reference to melinite, a high explosive composed of picric acid and guncotton adopted by the French army in 1887; and perhaps also to melon, a heptazine polymer described by Berzelius in 1830, whose structure remained a chemical puzzle until the 1930s.

== Publication history ==
- 1890 USA: New York: J. G. Ogilvie and Company, published as Topsy-Turvy
- 1891, UK, London: Sampson Low, Marston, Searle, & Rivington. First UK edition.
- 2012, UK, London: Hesperus Press, new translation by Sophie Lewis with a foreword by Professor Ian Fells, published as The World Turned Upside Down

== See also ==
- 1889 in science fiction
