= The Will of an Eccentric =

1900 French novel by Jules Verne

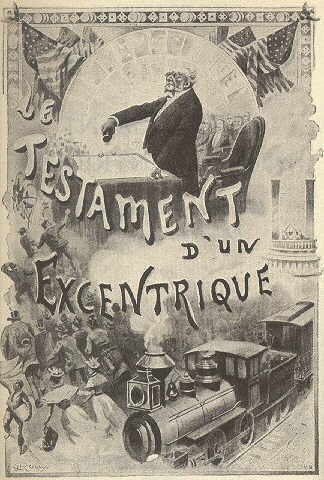
- Frontespiece of the french original edition
- Author: Jules Verne
- Original title: Le Testament d'un excentrique
- Illustrator: Georges Roux
- Language: French
- Series: The Extraordinary Voyages #46
- Genre: Adventure novel
- Publisher: Pierre-Jules Hetzel
- Publication date: 1900
- Publication place: France
- English publication date: 1900
- Media type: Print (Hardback)
- OCLC: 40237480
- Preceded by: The Mighty Orinoco
- Followed by: The Castaways of the Flag

The Will of an Eccentric (French: Le Testament d'un excentrique) is a 1900 adventure novel written by Jules Verne based on the Game of the Goose.

== Plot summary ==
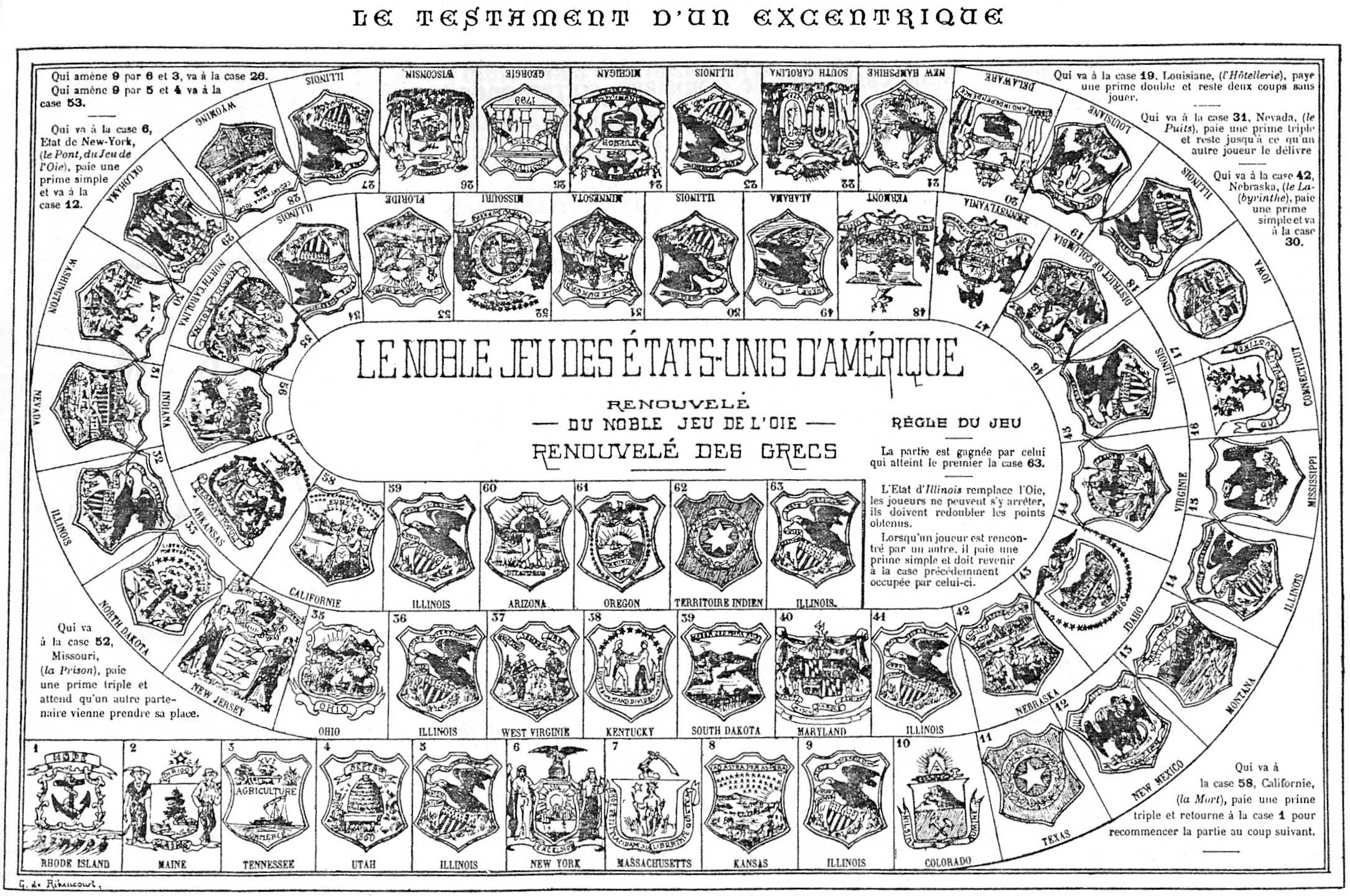
The Noble Game of the United States.

William J. Hypperbone, an eccentric millionaire, living in Chicago, has left the sum of his fortune, $60,000,000, to the first person to reach the end of "The Noble Game of the United States of America." The game he devised is based upon the board game "The Noble Game of Goose"; however, in his version, the players are the tokens and the game board is the United States. The contestants are Max Réal, with his companion Tommy; Tom Crabbe, with his trainer John Milner; Hermann Titbury, with his wife Kate; Harris T. Kymbale (on his own); Lizzie Wag, with her friend Jovita Foley; Hodge Urrican, with his companion Turk; and the mysterious player only known as "XKZ." Who is this mysterious "XKZ" who was added to the game by a codicil to the will? Time and completion of the game will tell.

In 1897, the first Baedecker guidebook for the U.S. was published, and Verne used this as the source for his descriptions of the modes of transport, timetables, and geographic descriptions of the numerous places the twelve participants were required to visit in order to claim the prize.

== Publication history ==
- 1899, France, Paris: J. Hetzel et Cie, Le Testament d'un excentrique, 1899 in magazine format and 1900 in illustrated book format.
- 1900, UK, London: Sampson Low, Marston & Co., 408 pp., English translation.
- This illustrated version was published by Sampson Low in England in October, 1900, and contains 59 of the original 61 illustrations from the French edition. This is the last book which Sampson Low published during Verne's lifetime. Interest in his works had declined and the number printed was low, resulting in this becoming one of the rarest of the Sampson Low editions of Verne's works, currently listed at over $5000 by antiquarian booksellers. Although the story takes place entirely in the United States, it has never been published there.
- 2008, first reprint published by Camille Cazedessus, Jr., Chimney Rock, Colorado. Complete facsimile of all 30 installments from Boy's Own Paper, Mar 3, 1900 to Sep 22, 1900 weekly issues, with 64+ engraved illustrations superbly reproduced by Roux, including the 65 state game board. 105 pages, side stapled, 8.5 x 11". Introduction by Brian Taves, Jules Verne scholar.
- In 2009, the Choptank Press republished the 1900 Sampson and Low illustrated edition together with an "Afterword" by Dr. Brian Taves.
- In 2016, ATBOSH Media published a Modern Edition. The Modern Edition is a scholarly work and not just a straight reproduction of the 1900 British publication; it corrects typos, translation errors, and modernizes obscure 19th century terms (all documented). The Modern Edition also corrects many logical inconsistencies found throughout the book (many both in the original French and English versions). The edition is edited and annotated, with supplemental materials written by Jared Bendis.
