= The Vanished Diamond =

1884 novel by Jules Verne

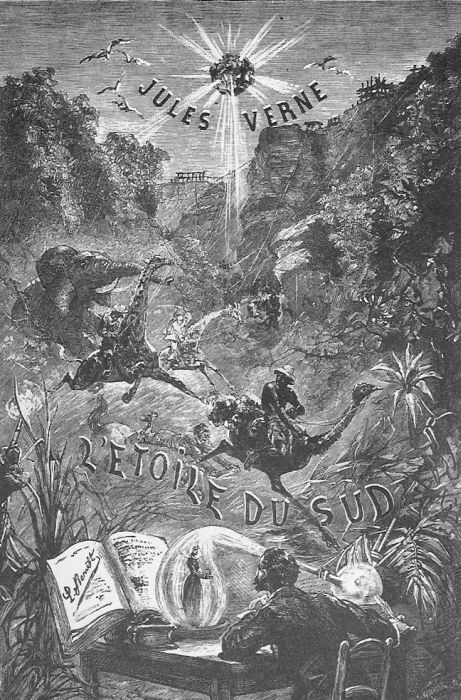
- Author: Jules Verne; Paschal Grousset (uncredited)
- Original title: L'Étoile du sud
- Illustrator: Léon Benett
- Language: French
- Series: The Extraordinary Voyages #25
- Genre: Adventure novel, Science fiction
- Publisher: Pierre-Jules Hetzel
- Publication date: 1884
- Publication place: France
- English publication date: 1885
- Media type: Print (Hardback)
- Preceded by: Kéraban the Inflexible
- Followed by: The Archipelago on Fire

The Vanished Diamond, also translated as The Southern Star (French: L'Étoile du sud, lit. The Star of the South), is an 1884 French novel credited to Jules Verne, based on an uncredited manuscript by Paschal Grousset.

== Setting ==
This novel takes place in South Africa amongst the diamond fields in the district of Griqualand. Most of the land is owned by a fictitious wealthy miner, Mr. John Watkins. A shanty town filled with miners has sprung up, all with the hope to get rich. The main area of diamond mining is the Vandergaart Kopje.

== Synopsis ==
The protagonist is a French mining engineer, Victor Cyprien (in the original French version: Cyprien Méré). He moves to the Griqualand district to study the formation of diamonds. While he is there he falls in love with wealthy landowner Mr. John Watkins' daughter, Alice. He asks him for her hand in marriage but is denied on his lack of money and stature in the community. He decides that he could amass a fortune by mining with a partner, Thomas Steel. They buy a mining claim and proceed to dig. Victor hires a team of Africans to mine the claim. The claim collapses when Victor's team of hired help is digging. He manages to rescue one of them, Mataki. Achieving no great finds, Victor is disheartened for there are many more eligible suitors than he.

Alice begs Cyprien to return to his studies. So Victor decides to attempt to artificially make a diamond. His experiment seems to work as a 243 carat (48.6 g) diamond is produced. He gives it to Mr. Watkins for Alice. Mr. Watkins holds a banquet in honor of Cyprien and his accomplishment. The diamond, christened as The Star of the South by Alice, is on display during this banquet. Midway through the banquet, the diamond vanishes as well as Victor's African hired help, Mataki. Mataki appears to flee with the diamond and Mr. Watkins, enraged, offers Alice's hand to whoever brings the diamond back. Victor and three other suitors set off to hunt Mataki down. They prepare to travel across the Veld.

Victor brings along two companions his laundry man, Li, and a member of his digging team, Bardik. Along the way, the other three of his companions perish at the hands of animals or disease. Victor captures Mataki, who states he does not have the diamond. The only reason he ran was because he was afraid he would be hanged unjustly for the diamond's disappearance. Victor returns to Griqualand and finds the diamond in the stomach of Alice's ostrich, Dada. Cyprien is almost hanged because his discovery of making artificial diamonds threatened the livelihood of the miners. He is only saved by Mataki's confession. Mataki found the diamond when he was covered by the landslide and stuck it in Victor's experiment in gratitude. Victor is shocked. Not caring about the diamond's origin, Mr. Watkins is glad for the recovery and holds another banquet. Mr. Vandergaart, the original owner of the land, bursts in with a certificate saying that the land is once again his. John Watkins is devastated and is even more so when the Star of the South disintegrates. He dies the next day of shock. Victor and Alice marry and live happily ever after.

== Writing and versions ==
The original manuscript of the novel, titled "L'Étoile du Sud : Aventures au pays des diamants" ("The Southern Star: Adventures in the Land of Diamonds") was written by the novelist and activist Paschal Grousset under the pseudonym Philippe Daryl. The publisher Pierre-Jules Hetzel bought the manuscript and assigned it to Jules Verne for revisions. It was published in 1884 under Verne's name as the twenty-fifth novel in the Voyages extraordinaires series.

In 2014, the Musée Jules Verne acquired Grousset's original manuscript. In 2020 a project was launched to prepare a critical edition of the manuscript, demonstrating the changes credited to Verne (whose own manuscript version is still missing and presumed lost), in association with the Musée and with the University of Nantes.

== Adaptations ==
The Southern Star (French title: L'Étoile du sud) is a 1969 British-French comedy crime film based on the novel, directed by Sidney Hayers and starring George Segal, Ursula Andress and Orson Welles.

French cartoonist Jacques Rémise adapted the story into a newspaper comic between 1956 and 1957.
