= Voyages extraordinaires =

Collection of works by Jules Verne

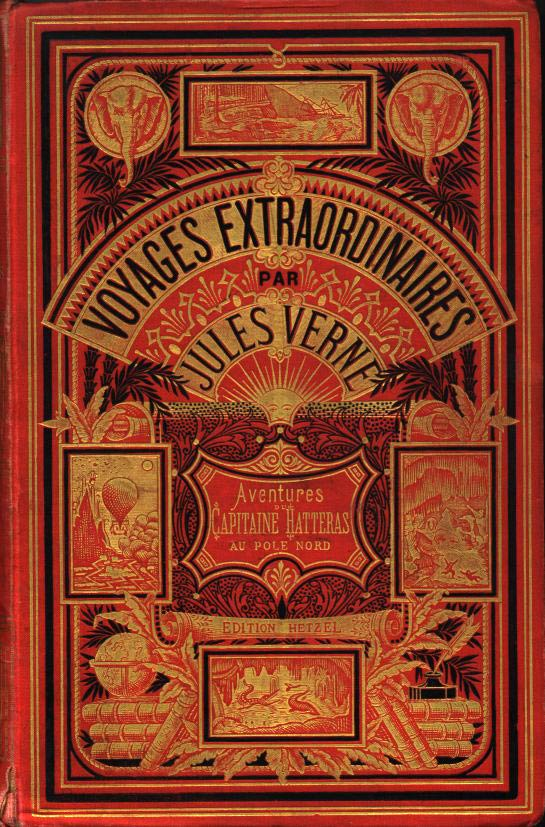
- A typical in-8º Hetzel cover for the Voyages Extraordinaires. The novel is Les Aventures du Capitaine Hatteras au Pôle Nord, and the cover style is "Aux deux éléphants" ("With two elephants").
- Author: Jules Verne
- Country: France
- Language: French
- Publisher: Pierre-Jules Hetzel
- Published: 1863–1905 (additional novels revised or written by Michel Verne added 1905–1919)
- Media type: print (hardcover and paperback)

The Voyages extraordinaires (French: [vwajaʒ ɛkstʁaɔʁdinɛʁ]; lit. 'Extraordinary Voyages' or 'Amazing Journeys') is a collection or sequence of novels and short stories by the French writer Jules Verne. The cycle features some of Verne's best known titles, such as Journey to the Center of the Earth, From the Earth to the Moon, Twenty Thousand Leagues Under the Seas, Around the World in Eighty Days and The Mysterious Island.

Fifty-four of these novels were originally published between 1863 and 1905, during the author's lifetime, and eight additional novels were published posthumously. The posthumous novels were published under Jules Verne's name, but had been extensively altered or, in one case, completely written by his son Michel Verne.

According to Verne's editor Pierre-Jules Hetzel, the goal of the Voyages was "to outline all the geographical, geological, physical, historical and astronomical knowledge amassed by modern science and to recount, in an entertaining and picturesque format ... the history of the universe."

Verne's meticulous attention to detail and scientific trivia, coupled with his sense of wonder and exploration, form the backbone of the Voyages. Part of the reason for the broad appeal of his work was the sense that the reader could gain real knowledge of geology, biology, astronomy, paleontology, oceanography, history and the exotic locations and cultures of the world through the adventures of Verne's protagonists. This great wealth of information distinguished his works as "encyclopedic novels".

The first of Verne's novels to carry the title Voyages Extraordinaires was The Adventures of Captain Hatteras, which was the third of all his novels.

The works in this series are adventure stories, some with overt science fiction elements (e.g., Journey to the Center of the Earth) or elements of scientific romance (e.g., Twenty Thousand Leagues Under the Seas).

== Theme ==
In a late interview, Verne affirmed that Hetzel's ambitious commission had become the running literary theme of his novel sequence:

It is my intention to complete, before my working days are done, a series which shall conclude in story form my whole survey of the world's surface and the heavens; there are still left corners of the world to which my thoughts have not yet penetrated. As you know, I have dealt with the moon, but a great deal remains to be done, and if health and strength permit me, I hope to finish the task.

However, Verne made clear that his own object was more literary than scientific, saying "I do not in any way pose as a scientist" and explaining in another interview:

My object has been to depict the earth, and not the earth alone, but the universe… And I have tried at the same time to realize a very high ideal of beauty of style. It is said that there can't be any style in a novel of adventure, but it isn't true; though I admit it is very much more difficult to write such a novel in a good literary form than the studies of character which are so vogue to-day.

== Publication ==
In the system developed by Hetzel for the Voyages Extraordinaires, each of Verne's novels was published successively in several different formats. This resulted in as many as four distinct editions of each text (labeled here according to current practice for Verne bibliographies):

- Éditions pré-originales (pre-original editions): Serialization in a periodical, usually Hetzel's own biweekly Magasin d'éducation et de récréation ("Magazine of Education and Recreation", founded 1864). The serialized installments were illustrated by artists on Hetzel's staff, such as Édouard Riou, Léon Benett, and George Roux.
- Éditions originales (original editions): complete unillustrated texts published in book form at 18mo size. (Similar versions in the slightly larger 12mo size, with illustrations taken from the serialization, are also considered éditions originales.)
- Cartonnages dorés et colorés (gilded and colored bindings): Complete editions of the text, published in grand in-8º ("large octavo") book form with a lavishly decorated cover. These deluxe editions, designed for Christmas and New Year's markets, include most or all of the illustrations from the serializations.

== Continued appeal ==
Jules Verne remains to this day the most translated science fiction author in the world as well as one of the most reprinted and widely read French authors. Though often scientifically outdated, his Voyages still retain elements that appealed to readers of his time and continue to encourage an interest in the sciences among younger leaders.

The Voyages are frequently adapted into film, from Georges Méliès' fanciful 1902 film Le Voyage dans la Lune (a.k.a. A Trip to the Moon), to Walt Disney's 1954 adaptation of Twenty Thousand Leagues Under the Seas, to the 1956 version of "Around the World in 80 Days", starring Cantinflas and David Niven, then 2004 version of Around the World in 80 Days starring Jackie Chan. Their spirit has also continued to influence fiction to this day, including James Gurney's Dinotopia series and "softening" Steampunk's dystopianism with utopian wonder and curiosity.

== List of novels ==
Most of the novels in the Voyages series (except for Five Weeks in a Balloon, Journey to the Center of the Earth, and The Purchase of the North Pole) were first serialized in periodicals, usually in Hetzel's Magasin d'Éducation et de récréation ("Magazine of Education and Recreation"). Almost all of the original book editions were published by Pierre-Jules Hetzel in octodecimo format, often in several volumes. (The one exception is Claudius Bombarnac, which was first published in a grand-in-8º edition.)

What follows are the 55 novels published in Verne's lifetime with the most common English-language title for each novel. The dates given are those of the first publication in book form.

1. Five Weeks in a Balloon (Cinq semaines en ballon, 1863)
2. The Adventures of Captain Hatteras (Voyages et aventures du capitaine Hatteras, 1866)
3. Journey to the Center of the Earth (Voyage au centre de la Terre, 1864, revised 1867)
4. From the Earth to the Moon (De la terre à la lune, 1865)
5. In Search of the Castaways (Les Enfants du capitaine Grant, 1867–68)
6. Twenty Thousand Leagues Under the Seas (Vingt mille lieues sous les mers, 1869–70)
7. Around the Moon (Autour de la lune, 1870)
8. A Floating City (Une ville flottante, 1871)
9. The Adventures of Three Englishmen and Three Russians in South Africa (Aventures de trois Russes et de trois Anglais, 1872)
10. The Fur Country (Le Pays des fourrures, 1873)
11. Around the World in Eighty Days (Le Tour du monde en quatre-vingts jours, 1873)
12. The Mysterious Island (L'Île mystérieuse, 1874–75)
13. The Survivors of the Chancellor (Le Chancellor, 1875)
14. Michael Strogoff (Michel Strogoff, 1876)
15. Off on a Comet (Hector Servadac, 1877)
16. The Child of the Cavern (Les Indes noires, 1877)
17. Dick Sand, A Captain at Fifteen (Un capitaine de quinze ans, 1878)
18. The Begum's Millions (Les Cinq Cents Millions de la Bégum, 1879)
19. Tribulations of a Chinaman in China (Les Tribulations d'un chinois en Chine, 1879)
20. The Steam House (La Maison à vapeur, 1880)
21. The Giant Raft (La Jangada, 1881)
22. Godfrey Morgan (L'École des Robinsons, 1882)
23. The Green Ray (Le Rayon vert, 1882)
24. Kéraban the Inflexible (Kéraban-le-têtu, 1883)
25. The Vanished Diamond (L'Étoile du sud, 1884)
26. The Archipelago on Fire (L'Archipel en feu, 1884)
27. Mathias Sandorf (Mathias Sandorf, 1885)
28. The Wreck of the "Cynthia" (L'Epave du "Cynthia", 1885)
29. The Lottery Ticket (Un billet de loterie, 1886)
30. Robur the Conqueror (Robur-le-Conquérant, 1886)
31. North Against South (Nord contre Sud, 1887)
32. The Flight to France (Le Chemin de France, 1887)
33. Two Years' Vacation (Deux Ans de vacances, 1888)
34. Family Without a Name (Famille-sans-nom, 1889)
35. The Purchase of the North Pole (Sans dessus dessous, 1889)
36. César Cascabel (César Cascabel, 1890)
37. Mistress Branican (Mistress Branican, 1891)
38. The Carpathian Castle (Le Château des Carpathes, 1892)
39. Claudius Bombarnac (Claudius Bombarnac, 1892)
40. Foundling Mick (P’tit-Bonhomme, 1893)
41. Captain Antifer (Mirifiques Aventures de Maître Antifer, 1894)
42. Propeller Island (L'Île à hélice, 1895)
43. Facing the Flag (Face au drapeau, 1896)
44. Clovis Dardentor (Clovis Dardentor, 1896)
45. An Antarctic Mystery (Le Sphinx des glaces, 1897)
46. The Mighty Orinoco (Le Superbe Orénoque, 1898)
47. The Will of an Eccentric (Le Testament d'un excentrique, 1899)
48. The Castaways of the Flag (Seconde Patrie, 1900)
49. The Village in the Treetops (Le Village aérien, 1901)
50. The Sea Serpent (Les Histoires de Jean-Marie Cabidoulin, 1901)
51. The Kip Brothers (Les Frères Kip, 1902)
52. Travel Scholarships (Bourses de voyage, 1903)
53. A Drama in Livonia (Un drame en Livonie, 1904)
54. Master of the World (Maître du monde, 1904)
55. Invasion of the Sea (L'Invasion de la mer, 1905)

The posthumous additions to the series, extensively altered by Verne's son Michel, but the original editions are as follows.

55. The Lighthouse at the End of the World (Le Phare du bout du monde, 1999)
56. The Golden Volcano (Le Volcan d’or, 1989)
57. The Chase of the Golden Meteor (La Chasse au météore, 1986)
58. The Beautiful Yellow Danube (La Beau Danube Jaune, 1988)
59. In Magellania (En Magellanie, 1985/1987)
60. The Secret of Wilhelm Storitz (Le Secret de Wilhelm Storitz, 1999)
61. Study Trip (Voyage d'études, 1991)

== Short stories ==
The Voyages series includes a short story collection containing 4 short stories and 10 individual short stories that accompanied one of the novels in the series.

The short story collection is:

- Doctor Ox (Le Docteur Ox, 1874)

And the individual short stories:

1. The Blockade Runners (Les Forceurs de blocus, published with A Floating City, 1871)
2. Martin Paz (Martin Paz, published with The Survivors of the Chancellor, 1875)
3. A Drama in Mexico (Un drame au Mexique, published with Michael Strogoff, 1876)
4. The Mutineers of the Bounty (Les révoltés de la Bounty, published with The Begum's Millions, 1879)
5. Ten Hours Hunting (Dix heures en chasse, published with The Green Ray, 1882)
6. Frritt-Flacc (Frritt-Flacc, published with The Lottery Ticket, 1886)
7. Gil Braltar (published with The Flight to France, 1887)
8. "The Humbug" ("Le Humbug", 1985)
9. "Le Rat goutteux" ("The Gouty Rat, 1989)
10. "Mr. Ray Sharp and Miss Me Flat" ("M. Ré-Dièze et Mlle Mi-Bémol", 1989)

== Classification ==
In promotional materials for the series, Verne's editor Pierre-Jules Hetzel classified the Voyages Extraordinaires in several groups, mostly following geographic criteria:

- The Robinsons Cycle: Godfrey Morgan, Two Years' Vacation, The Castaways of the Flag, The Survivors of the "Jonathan"
- Europe: Journey to the Center of the Earth, The Child of the Cavern, The Green Ray, The Archipelago on Fire, The Lottery Ticket, The Flight to France, Carpathian Castle, Foundling Mick, A Drama in Livonia, The Danube Pilot, The Secret of Wilhelm Storitz
- Africa: Five Weeks in a Balloon, The Adventures of Three Englishmen and Three Russians in South Africa, Dick Sand, A Captain at Fifteen, The Vanished Diamond, Clovis Dardentor, The Village in the Treetops, Invasion of the Sea, The Thompson Travel Agency, The Barsac Mission
- The Polar Lands: The Adventures of Captain Hatteras, The Fur Country, An Antarctic Mystery
- World Tours: In Search of the Castaways, Twenty Thousand Leagues under the Seas, Around the World in Eighty Days, Robur the Conqueror, Captain Antifer
- The Two Americas: The Begum's Millions, The Giant Raft, North Against South, Family Without a Name, César Cascabel, Facing the Flag, The Mighty Orinoco, The Will of an Eccentric, Travel Scholarships, Master of the World, The Golden Volcano
- Asia: Michael Strogoff, Tribulations of a Chinaman in China, The Steam House, Claudius Bombarnac
- Seas and Oceans: A Floating City, The Mysterious Island, The Survivors of the Chancellor, Kéraban the Inflexible, Mathias Sandorf, The Sea Serpent, Lighthouse at the End of the World
- Celestial Spaces: From the Earth to the Moon, Around The Moon, Off on a Comet, The Purchase of the North Pole, The Chase of the Golden Meteor
- Oceania and Australia: Mistress Branican, Propeller Island, The Kip Brothers
- Tales and News: Doctor Ox, Yesterday and Tomorrow

== See also ==
- Scientific romance
- Edisonade
- Steampunk
- Adventure fiction
