= Frritt-Flacc =

1884 horror short story by Jules Verne

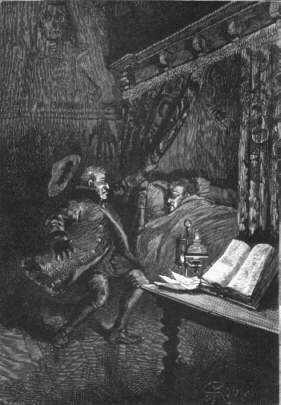
- An Illustration by Georges Roux (1886)
- Author: Jules Verne
- Original title: Frritt-Flacc
- Language: French
- Genre: Horror short story
- Publication date: December 1884
- Publication place: France
- English publication date: 1892, The Strand Magazine

"Frritt-Flacc" is a horror short story by Jules Verne. It was first published in December 1884 in the magazine Le Figaro illustré and then in 1886 together with the novel The Lottery Ticket as a part of the Voyages Extraordinaires series. The first English translation was published in 1892 in The Strand Magazine.

== Setting ==
The story is set in the fictional port town of Luktrop, consisting of about "a hundred houses" and "four or five hilly streets". The town is located at the Volsinian coast, between the mountains of Crimma and the "vast Sea of Megalocrida". Near the town is Vauglor, an active volcano. "During the day it sends forth sulphurous vapours; at night, from time to time, great outpourings of flame." The flames of the volcano serve as the town's lighthouse, allowing travelers to locate the port.

The town is surrounded by ruins, supposedly "dating from the Crimmarian era". It has its own suburb, with white walls, domed roofs, and sun-scorched terraces. The suburb is built in the style of a Kasbah, and the unnamed narrator describes its appearance as similar to Arab architecture.

The tallest building in Luktrop is a square belfry, dedicated to Saint Philfilena. The town and the belfry are at times affected by hurricanes, and the hurricanes set in motion the bells. The locals considered these unscheduled ringings of the bells to be a bad omen.

The vicinity of Luktrop has "scattered habitations", which the narrator describes as similar to those in Brittany. The narrator explains that Luktrop is not located in Brittany, but claims to not know whether it is located in France or in Europe.

== Plot summary ==
Frritt expresses the sounds of a roaring hurricane and flacc the sound of falling streams of water during a rainstorm.

Dr. Trifulgas, a physician, lives in Luktrop, at a building known as the "Six-four", due to having six openings on one side and four on the other. The "Six-four" is described as one of the richest and most comfortable houses in Luktrop. Due to his medical career, Trifulgas owns a fortune consisting of "millions of fretzers" (the local currency). He reportedly lacks compassion and insists on receiving advance payments before treating any patient. He lives alone with his pet dog Hurzof, a mongrel.

On a stormy night, Trifulgas is visited at home by a young girl, who asks him to tend to her dying father. Trifulgas enquires on the name of the father. When he learns that the father is Vort Kartif, a man who trades in salted herring at a location called Val Karnion, he refuses to help the girl. Trifulgas knows Kartif, and knows that he is a poor man. He does not expect to receive sufficient payment from him, so chooses not to bother and goes back to sleep.

Twenty minutes later, Trifulgas is visited by a woman claiming to be Vort Kartif's wife. She wants him to travel to Val Karnion with her and tend to her dying husband, and offers a payment of twenty fretzers. Trifulgas rejects her offer, as he finds the offered payment insufficient. He does not wish to travel in a storm and risk catching a cold or to suffer from lumbago. He also expects to soon visit Edzingov, a rich patient suffering from gout, and he charges the man fifty fretzers for every visit. Trifulgas goes back to sleep.

Later than night, Trifulgas is visited by a woman claiming to be Vort Kartif's mother. He is annoyed and wishes for Kartif's daughter, wife, and mother to perish with him. The woman claims to have money, from the recent sale of their house to "camondeur Doutrup". Trifulgas asks for a payment of two-hundred fretzers, but the woman only has a hundred and twenty fretzers. Trifulgas initially turns down the offer, but changes his mind after figuring that "a small profit" is better than nothing.

Trifulgas receives his payment in advance, and follows the old woman by foot. His trained dog carries a lantern to light their way. Trifulgas can hear the bells ringing, but ignores the bad omen. He does not believe in superstitions. Shortly before they reach Kartif's house, the volcano explodes and Trifulgas is hurled to the ground. When he rises from the ground, the lantern has been extinguished and the old woman has disappeared. Trifulgas walks alone towards Kartif's house. Having already received his payment, he is determined to fulfil his part of the bargain.

When Trifulgas reaches Kartif's house, he realizes that it resembles the "Six-four" in many ways. He strangely feels as if entering his own house. He enters the house alone, through an unlocked door. Hurzof, his dog, stays outside the house and starts howling. Inside the house, Trifulgas recognizes the rooms, furniture, and books from the "Six-four". He even finds a book open at page 197, the same book he left open at that page earlier in the story. Trifulgas suddenly feels fear. He approaches the bed, and finds himself lying there. His patient is not Vort Kartif, but Trifulgas himself.

Trifulgas quickly recognizes symptoms in the patient: heart failure, cerebral apoplexy, paralysis of the body. Soon there is organ failure, both the heart and the lungs cease to function. Desperate for a cure for his patient-self, Trifulgas decides to try bloodletting. But no blood flows from the open veins. As the doctor tends to the patient, he starts demonstrating signs of poor health. First the patient dies, then the doctor. Both versions of Trifulgas are dead, as he has failed to heal himself.

The following morning, Trifulgas' corpse is discovered in the "Six-four". The locals arrange his funeral at the cemetery of Luktrop, where he is buried alongside former patients whose lives he had failed to save. Hurzof the dog has disappeared, but the folklore of Luktrop and Volsinia speaks of the dog haunting the country, a long time after the death of its master. Hurzof is still transporting Trifulgas' lantern, and reportedly keeps howling like a lost dog.

== Publication history ==
as "Dr. Trifulgas: A Fantastic Tale" (trans. unknown)

- July–December 1892 – The Strand Magazine No.19
- 1975 – in Before Armageddon, ed. Michael Moorcock, New York: W.H. Allen
- 1999 – in Jules Verne The Eternal Adam, and other Stories, ed. Peter Costello, London: Phoenix
- 1999 – in Enigmatic Tales, ed. L. H. Maynard & M. P. N. Sims, Maynard Sims Productions

as "The Ordeal of Dr. Trifulgas" (trans. Willis T. Bradley)

- July 1957 – in Saturn magazine

as "Frritt-Flacc" (trans. I.O. Evans)

- November 1959 – The Magazine of Fantasy & Science Fiction
- 1965 – in Jules Verne, Yesterday and Tomorrow, ed. I.O. Evans, London: Arco

as "The Storm" (trans. Alberto Manguel)

- 1983 – in Black Water: The Book of Fantastic Literature, New York: Clarkson N. Potter
