= The Village in the Treetops =

1901 novel by Jules Verne

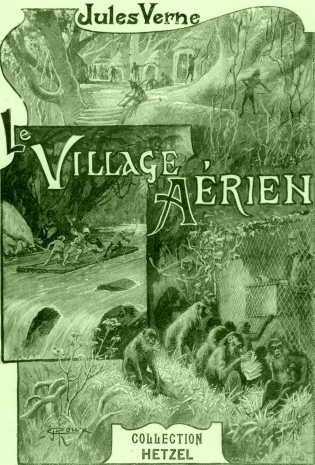
- Author: Jules Verne
- Original title: Le Village aérien
- Translator: I.O. Evans
- Illustrator: Georges Roux
- Language: French
- Series: The Extraordinary Voyages #48
- Genre: Adventure novel
- Publisher: Pierre-Jules Hetzel
- Publication date: 1901
- Publication place: France
- English publication date: 1964
- Media type: Print (hardback)
- Preceded by: The Castaways of the Flag
- Followed by: The Sea Serpent

The Village in the Treetops (French: Le Village aérien, lit. The Aerial Village) is a 1901 novel by French author Jules Verne. The book, one of Verne's Voyages extraordinaires, is his take on Darwinism and human development.

== Plot ==
In 1898, two adventurers in their mid-20s, American John Cort and Frenchman Max Huber, work in some kind of factory in Libreville, Gabon, in central Africa. They had just returned from an ivory-hunting trip with a Portuguese trader and a sizable entourage. When an elephant stampede kills the trader and drives out all the servants, the caravan is immediately in trouble. Cort and Huber are left alone with Khamis, a 35-year-old Cameroonian "foreloper" guide, and their adopted native son, Llanga, who is 10 years old. Now that they have to walk more than 1,000 kilometers to get back to Libreville, the four of them choose to take a shortcut by going through the vast, uncharted Ubangi jungle. After several weeks of travel and numerous terrifying experiences, the four find the remains of a camp owned by a man named Dr. Johausen. He had vanished three years prior while researching the apes' language. Additionally, they save a young boy who is more monkey than human from drowning, and finally, they make the most shocking discovery of all: the village of Ngala, which is inhabited by the apelike Waggdi tribe and is situated on a massive platform 100 feet up in the trees. This community may be the long-sought "missing link." The Waggdis treat the quartet with courtesy, but the issue of their ability to depart is still very much alive.

== Publication history ==
- 1964, UK, London, Arco, 191 pp.
- 1964, US, Ace, 190 pp.
