= The Archipelago on Fire =

1884 novel by Jules Verne

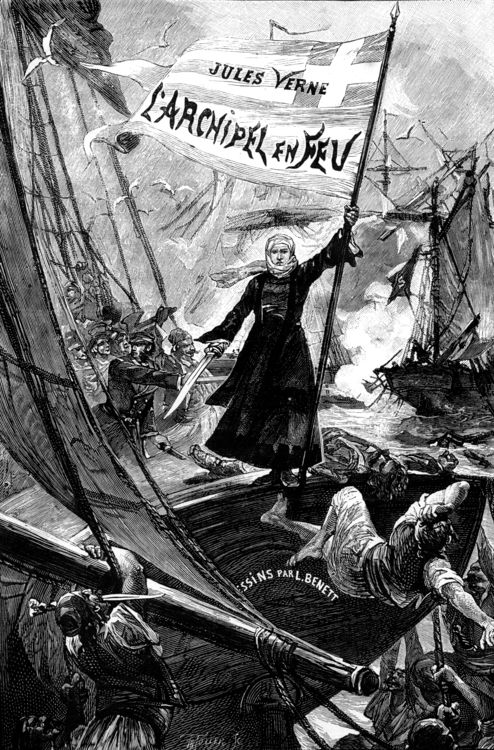
- Author: Jules Verne
- Original title: L’Archipel en feu
- Illustrator: Léon Benett
- Language: French
- Series: The Extraordinary Voyages #26
- Genre: Adventure novel
- Publisher: Pierre-Jules Hetzel
- Publication date: 1884
- Publication place: France
- English publication date: 1885
- Preceded by: The Vanished Diamond
- Followed by: Mathias Sandorf
- Original text: L’Archipel en feu at French Wikisource

The Archipelago on Fire (French: L’Archipel en feu, 1884) is an adventure novel written by Jules Verne, taking place during the Greek War of Independence.

== Plot ==
On the 18th of October, 1827, about five o’clock in the evening, a small Levantine vessel piloted by Captain Nicholas Starcos of the Karysta returns home to Vitylo, an ancient village in the Peloponnesus, only to be denied entry by his mother, who denounces him for what he has become.

Lt. Henry d’Albaret of the French Navy, and other Frenchmen, have joined the Greeks in this war. After recovering from a wound received in battle, d’Albaret meets Hadjine Elizundo, his banker's lovely daughter. They fall in love then make plans to marry, but Starcos, who holds a devastating secret against the girl's father, demands her hand in marriage—or else. The distraught father soon dies, thus freeing Hadjine from her obligation of marrying Starcos, but she breaks off her engagement to d’Albaret, who is a respectable and honest man, because of her father's scandalous dealings with Captain Starcos.

While she takes steps to right her father's wrongs, the distraught d’Albaret returns to the war until he is given command of the ship Syphanta. He then sails along the archipelago in search of pirates, who are taking advantage of the conflict. Eventually d’Albaret tracks Sacratif, a notorious pirate, to Crete, where Verne brings this informative and entertaining novel to a surprise ending.

== Publication history ==
- 1885, US, New York: New York, G. Munro, First US edition
- 1886, UK, London: Sampson Low, Marston, Searle, & Rivington, First UK edition
