= Texar's Revenge, or, North Against South =

1887 novel by Jules Verne

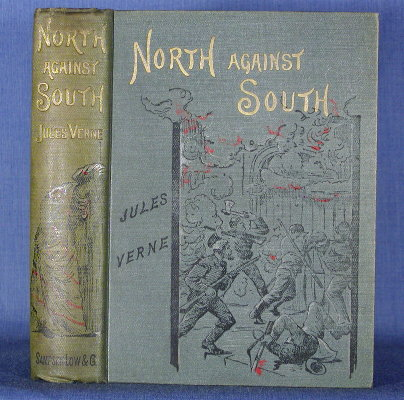
- English first edition cover
- Author: Jules Verne
- Original title: Nord contre Sud
- Illustrator: Léon Benett
- Language: French
- Series: The Extraordinary Voyages #30
- Genre: Adventure novel
- Publisher: Pierre-Jules Hetzel
- Publication date: 1887
- Publication place: France
- English publication date: 1887
- Media type: Print (Hardback)
- Preceded by: Robur the Conqueror
- Followed by: The Flight to France

Texar's Revenge, or, North Against South (French: Nord contre Sud) is the full title of the English translation of the novel written by the French science-fiction author Jules Verne, and centers on the story of James Burbank, an antislavery northerner living near Jacksonville, Florida, and Texar, a pro-slavery southerner who holds a vendetta against Burbank. Originally published in France in 1887, the book received a tepid reaction upon its release in the United States, partly because of Verne's inexpertise regarding some details of the American Civil War, and has since fallen into obscurity compared to many of Verne's other works.

== Plot summary ==
Texar and Burbank are bitter enemies, Burbank's northern view of slavery as an evil being an unpopular stance with Texar and the rest of the community, deep in the Confederate States of America. On top of this disagreement, though, Texar is angry at Burbank for past legal troubles Burbank has brought upon Texar, and, despite Texar inventing a perfect alibi that allows him to escape conviction, Texar feels the need for vengeance and eventually becomes a prominent and powerful member of the Jacksonville community. Using this newfound power, Texar turns the townsfolk against Burbank and leads a mob that destroys the Burbank plantation, known as Camdless Bay. Burbank's daughter Dy and caretaker Zermah are both kidnapped by a man claiming to be Texar and are purportedly taken to a place in the Everglades called Carneral Island. En route, and after enlisting the help of the United States Navy, they find a separate group searching for Texar in response to crimes that apparently happened in the same time as the ones at Camdless Bay but in a distant location. This opens up the realization that there is one real Texar and one who is not, and the search continues now, not only for Dy and Zermah, but for the answer to this mystery.

== Publication history ==
Nord Contre Sud, the original French title of the book, was first published in its fully illustrated edition in November, 1887, by J. Hetzel et Cie, Paris. In the first American (and first English) translation, Nord Contre Sud (North Against South) was relegated to a subtitle and the book's title was made Texar's Vengeance, quickly re-translated as Texar's Revenge. This edition was published by George Munro, New York (1887), a translation by Laura E. Kendall as part of the "Seaside Library". Since then, however, there have been more minor variations on the title, some editions referring to the title as "The Texar's Revenge", others omitting the title completely in favor of the more simple "North Against South". The most common and generally most accepted American version of the title is the full "Texar's Revenge, or, North Against South". There have also been a handful of editions that have split the book into two volumes, those being "Burbank the Northerner" and "Texar the Southerner", both of which are contained in most editions of the book. Various cheap editions were published in the U.S. for the next 20 years by W. L. Allison, Hurst, and others.

The first fully illustrated edition in English was North against South published by Sampson Low, Marston, Searle, and Rivington, London, December 1887. This is a different anonymous translation from the one published by George Munro. In 2007 the first fully illustrated edition of North against South in the U.S. was published by the Choptank Press of St. Michaels, Maryland as a Lulu Press book, a replica re-publication of the Sampson Low first edition.

== Quote ==
[In Jules Verne's] story of "Texar"... a very thin streak of narrative is padded to almost unwieldy proportions by a quantity of remarkably inaccurate information about the rebellion. If anyone thought the game worth the candle it would be easy to point out the various comical inaccuracies in the historical part of the story... [quoted in T&M]
