= A Drama in Livonia =

1893 novel by Jules Verne

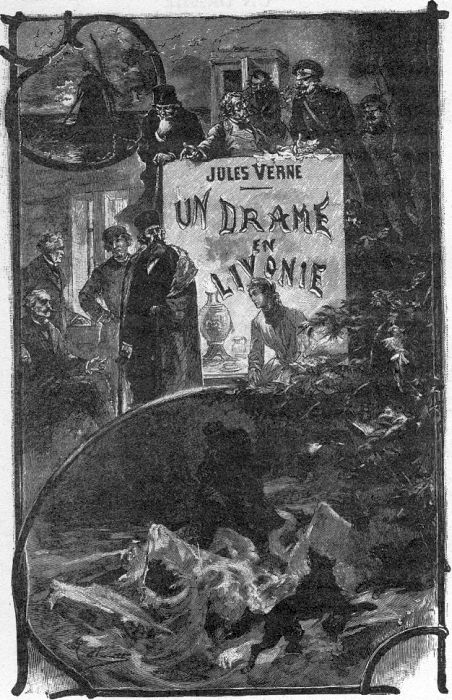
- Author: Jules Verne
- Original title: Un drame en Livonie
- Translator: I. O. Evans
- Illustrator: Léon Benett
- Language: French
- Series: The Extraordinary Voyages No. 52
- Genre: Adventure novel, tragedy
- Publisher: Pierre-Jules Hetzel
- Publication date: 1904
- Publication place: France
- English publication date: 1967
- Media type: Print (hardback)
- Preceded by: Traveling Scholarships
- Followed by: The Lighthouse at the End of the World

A Drama in Livonia (French: Un drame en Livonie) is a tragic mystery novel written by Jules Verne in 1893, revised in 1903 and first published in 1904.

== Plot outline ==
In the Governorate of Livonia, a bank employee who is carrying money is murdered. The prime suspect is Professor Dimitri Nicolef. He was the only person present, besides the innkeeper German Kroff. Wladimir Yanof, a lawyer and the fiancé of Ilka Nicolef (the professor's daughter), has escaped from Siberia to prove the innocence of his future father-in-law.

== Publication history ==
- 1967, UK, London: Arco. 192 pp., First UK edition
