= Gil Braltar =

1887 short story by Jules Verne

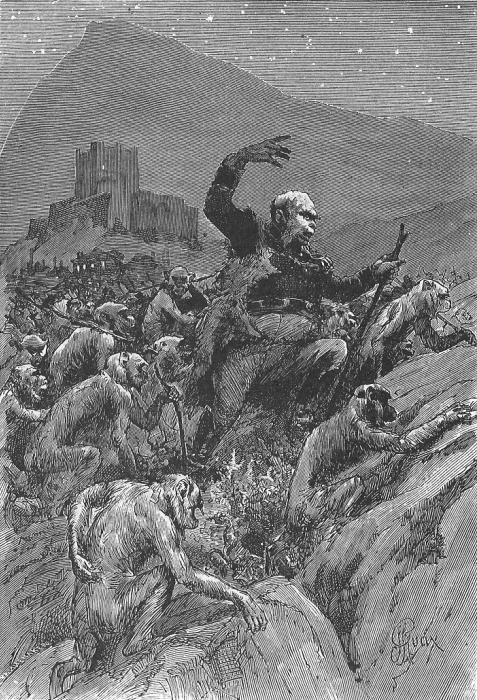
- Illustration by Georges Roux
- Author: Jules Verne
- Illustrator: Georges Roux
- Language: French
- Genre: Satirical short story
- Publication date: 1887
- Publication place: France

Gil Braltar is a satirical short story by French author Jules Verne. It was first published together with The Flight to France as a part of the Extraordinary Voyages series in 1887.

The story is set in Gibraltar. A Spanish man named Gil Braltar dresses up as a barbary macaque and becomes leader of a group of barbary macaques living there. He incites attack on a fortress in Gibraltar. The attack, initially successful, is foiled by a British general. This general is so ugly that the monkeys believe he was one of them and obey him when he leads them out. Verne's conclusion is that in the future only the ugliest generals will be sent to Gibraltar to keep the territory in British hands.

== See also ==
- In the Year 2889, Jules Verne's 1889 short story, also mentions Gibraltar as the last remnant of a British Empire that has lost control over the British Isles.
