= Travel Scholarships =

1903 novel by Jules Verne

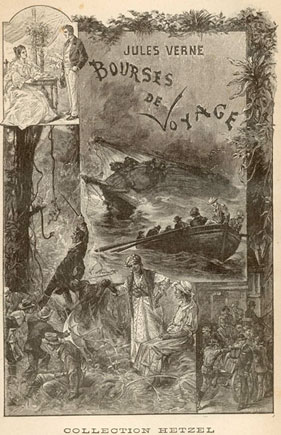
- Frontispiece of the French edition
- Author: Jules Verne
- Original title: Bourses de voyage
- Translator: Teri J. Hernández
- Illustrator: Léon Benett
- Language: French
- Series: The Extraordinary Voyages No. 51
- Genre: Adventure novel
- Publisher: Pierre-Jules Hetzel
- Publication date: 1903
- Publication place: France
- English publication date: 2013
- Media type: Print (hardcover)
- Preceded by: The Kip Brothers
- Followed by: A Drama in Livonia

Travel Scholarships (French: Bourses de voyage) is a 1903 adventure novel by Jules Verne.

== Summary ==
Antilian School is a renowned London college, which hosts only young European people born in the Caribbean. Nine of its students are to be awarded travel grants offered by the school's sponsor, a wealthy Barbados woman.

Harry Markel, a former captain turned pirate, has been captured and transferred to England, but he escapes along with his right-hand man John Carpenter and the rest of his accomplices – known collectively as the "Pirates of the Halifax" – and seizes the Alert, a three-masted ship leaving, after having massacred the captain and crew. It is precisely the ship that's just embarking the winners, accompanied by their mentor Horatio Patterson, the bursar of the school.

The long voyage across the Atlantic starts and Markel and his crew, who have assumed the identity of the murdered officers and sailors, prepare to kill the passengers. But Markel learns that they will receive a large sum of money from the hands of their benefactor upon their arrival in Barbados. By greed, he resigns himself to temporarily leave the students alive a little more.

On stops in stops, they visit the islands where they were born, receiving a warm welcome from their parents and their friends. The trip in the archipelago is a delight, but it may end tragically. Indeed, when Markel confirms that the youngsters are in possession of the prize offered by Mrs. Seymour, he is preparing to commit his crime.

However, to Markel's bad fortune, a sailor named Will Mitz takes place on board the Alert on the recommendation of Mrs. Seymour. Mitz surprises the criminal plan of the false captain, over-hearing one of the pirates' conversations. Taking advantage of the night, he attempts an escape with the students and Patterson, but fails, then after a brief confrontation, takes command of the ship after locking up Markel and Carpenter on the captain's quarters and the other pirates in the ship's cellar, where they discover rum and get drunk. After a while, Markel and Carpenter finally manage to get out and go free their fellow criminals, but it is too late. The pirates experience a horrible end, having accidentally caused a fire that sinks the vessel.

Meanwhile, Mitz and his protégés succeed in escaping in the ship's demise aboard a boat, and live through difficult times before being rescued by a steamer and repatriated to Britain where, having received notice of their adventure, they are received by the press and a large crowd.

At the end, after their exciting and eventful trip, the students gather at their school for another busy year.

== Publication ==
Travel Scholarships was serialized in the Magasin d’Éducation et de Récréation from January 1 to December 15, 1903, and published in book form by the publishing house of Pierre-Jules Hetzel in two volumes on July 1, 1903, and November 9, 1903, respectively. A large-format grand-in-8º illustrated edition followed on November 19, 1903. The illustrator was Léon Benett.

An English translation by Teri J. Hernández was published by Wesleyan University Press in 2013, making Travel Scholarships the final novel in Verne's Voyages Extraordinaires series to be translated into English.
