= The Mighty Orinoco =

1898 novel by Jules Verne

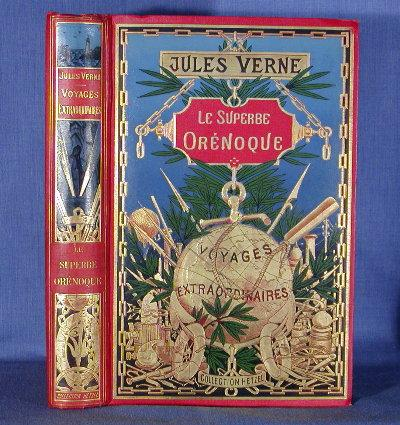
- Cover of the first illustrated edition
- Author: Jules Verne
- Original title: Le Superbe Orénoque
- Translator: Stanford Luce
- Illustrator: Georges Roux
- Language: French
- Series: The Extraordinary Voyages #45
- Genre: Adventure novel
- Publisher: Pierre-Jules Hetzel
- Publication date: 1898
- Publication place: France
- English publication date: 2002
- Media type: Print (Hardback)
- ISBN: 0-8195-6511-3
- Preceded by: An Antarctic Mystery
- Followed by: The Will of an Eccentric

The Mighty Orinoco (French: Le Superbe Orénoque) is a novel by French writer Jules Verne (1828–1905), first published in 1898 as a part of the Voyages extraordinaires. It tells the story of young Jeanne's journey up the Orinoco River in Venezuela with her protector, Sergeant Martial, in order to find her father, Colonel de Kermor, who disappeared some years before.

The first publication was as a serial in the Magasin d'éducation et de récréation from January 1 to December 15, 1898; as a single volume, it was published November 24, 1898.

== Gallery ==
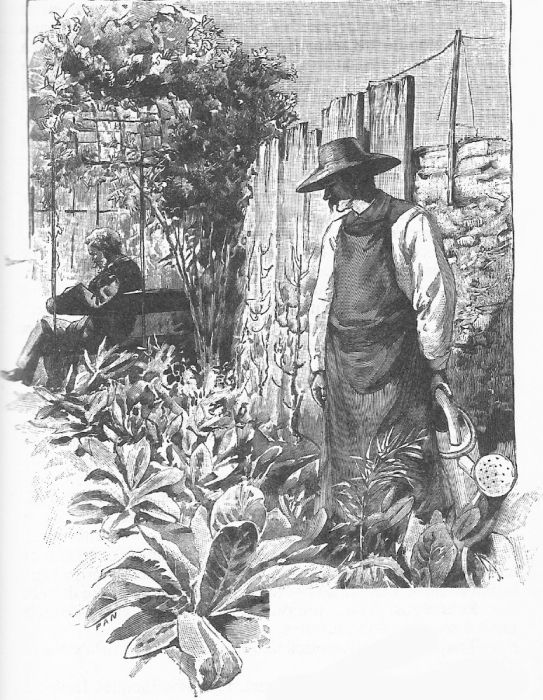
An illustration from the novel drawn by George Roux
