= The Kip Brothers =

1902 novel by Jules Verne

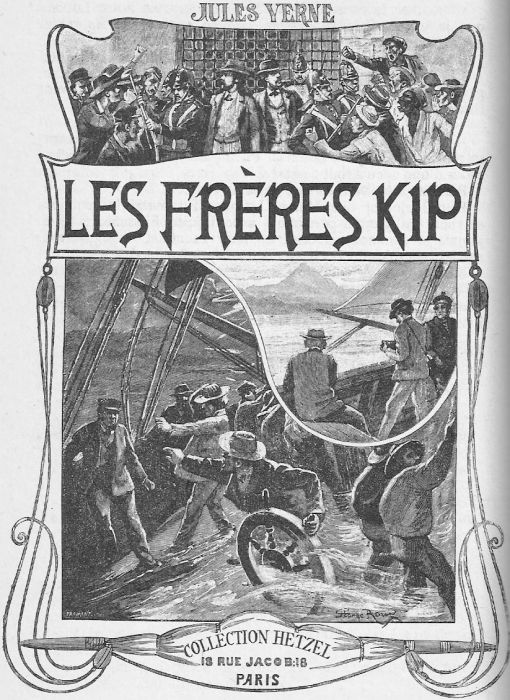
- Title page of 1st illustrated French edition
- Author: Jules Verne
- Original title: Les Frères Kip
- Translator: Stanford Luce
- Illustrator: Georges Roux
- Language: French
- Series: The Extraordinary Voyages No. 50
- Genre: Adventure novel
- Publisher: Pierre-Jules Hetzel
- Publication date: 1902
- Publication place: France
- English publication date: 2007
- Media type: Print (hardback)
- Preceded by: The Sea Serpent
- Followed by: Traveling Scholarships

The Kip Brothers (French: Les Frères Kip, 1902) is an adventure novel written by Jules Verne, one of his Voyages extraordinaires. Castaways on a barren island in the South Seas, Karl and Pieter Kip are rescued by the brig James Cook. After helping to quell an onboard mutiny, however, they suddenly find themselves accused and convicted of the captain's murder. In this story, one of his last Voyages Extraordinaires, Verne interweaves an exciting exploration of the South Pacific with a tale of judicial error reminiscent of the infamous Dreyfus Affair.

== Publication history ==
- 2007, USA, Wesleyan University Press, 514 pp., 60 illus., ISBN 0-8195-6704-3, First English translation
