= The Lottery Ticket =

1886 adventure novel by Jules Verne

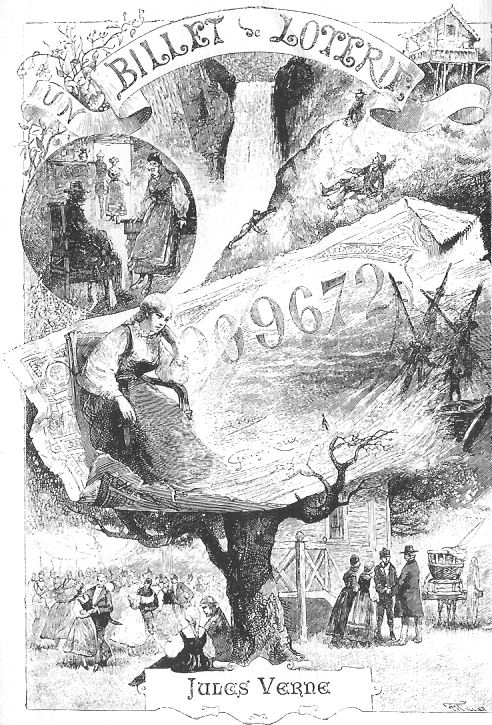
- An illustration The Lottery Ticket drawn by George Roux. It was also published in the United States under the title Ticket No. "9672".
- Author: Jules Verne
- Original title: Un Billet de loterie
- Translator: Laura E. Kendall
- Illustrator: Georges Roux
- Language: French
- Series: The Extraordinary Voyages #28
- Genre: Adventure novel
- Publisher: Pierre-Jules Hetzel
- Publication date: 1886
- Publication place: France
- English publication date: 1886
- Preceded by: Mathias Sandorf
- Followed by: Robur the Conqueror

Note: Anton Chekhov (1860–1904) has also written a short story called The Lottery Ticket.

The Lottery Ticket (French: Un Billet de loterie, 1886) is an adventure novel written by Jules Verne. It was also published in the United States under the title Ticket No. "9672".

== Publication history ==
- 1886, US, New York: George Munro, published as Ticket No. "9672"
- 1886, UK, London: Sampson Low, Marston, Searle, & Rivington.

== Plot ==
The story is about a peaceful family living in Dal, Norway, Miss Hansen, a widow, and her children Hulda and Joel. They are running a hotel while Joel works as a guide for tourists exploring the area. Miss Hansen is always sad and evasive as if she is hiding some secret. Hulda's best friend is Siegfried Helmboe, the daughter of a wealthy agronomist and she is engaged with Ole, a sailor which has left for New Foundland and he is about to return in a few weeks but there are no news of him.

One day, a strange unpleasant old man named Sandgoist, visits the hotel while Joel is away and behaves aggressively, as if he owned the place. He stays for one night, he carefully inspects the hotel and then leaves without paying, as Miss Hansen disposes the bill on hearing of his name.

Joel and Hulda save a reckless visitor from a hiking tour, which turns out to be a professor and a parliament member named Sylvius Hogg and he becomes a friend of the family. He tries to find the whereabouts of Ole, eventually finding out that his ship has sunk and all that was left is a lottery ticket with the number 9672 which was found in a bottle with a letter for his fiancée.

The sad news of Ole's ship gone is published in the newspapers and people show an increasing interest in buying the lottery ticket, considering it lucky. Hulda rejects all proposals which, as the draw date approaches, raise to a significant amount. However Sandgoist visits the hotel again and reveals his true identity: He is a usurer which bought a mortgage on the hotel after Miss Hansen was obliged to borrow money after investing in risky businesses left her bankrupt; that was the secret of her sad life. Hulda is forced to exchange the lottery ticket with Sangoist ultimate blackmailing offer, to release the hotel completely free of the mortgage.

The blackmailing story is heard all over Norway, especially in Christiania (now Oslo) and the people's attitude on the ticket is reversed; Despite Sandgoist's efforts to sell it, no one wants to buy it anymore. Meanwhile, the professor returns to the hotel and learns about the blackmailing. He persuades Hulda and Joel to be present to the lottery draw in memory of Ole.

When the lottery drawing event date comes, the 9672 ticket wins the highest prize of 100.000 marks (about 1 million EUR today) in front of a surprised, enraged audience. While everyone is furiously awaiting for Sandgoist to claim the money, Ole appears instead. It turned out that he was saved from the wreck and the professor found him, advising him to appear at the draw. Mr Hogg had bought the ticket from Sandgoist which was at the time relieved because he couldn't sell it; now he is going crazy out of despair. Eventually Hulda marries Ole, Siegfried marries Joel and everyone is happy.
