= 1895 in science fiction =

The year 1895 was marked, in science fiction, by the following events.

== Births and deaths ==
=== Births ===
- January 16 : Nat Schachner, American writer (died 1955)
- December 16 : (in French) B. R. Bruss, French writer (died 1980)

== Literary releases ==
=== Novels ===
- Propeller Island by Jules Verne.
- The Time Machine by H. G. Wells.

=== Short stories ===
- "Un Autre Monde" ("Another World") by J.-H. Rosny aîné

== Awards ==
The main science-fiction Awards known at the present time did not exist at that time.
