= The Giant Raft =

1881 novel by Jules Verne

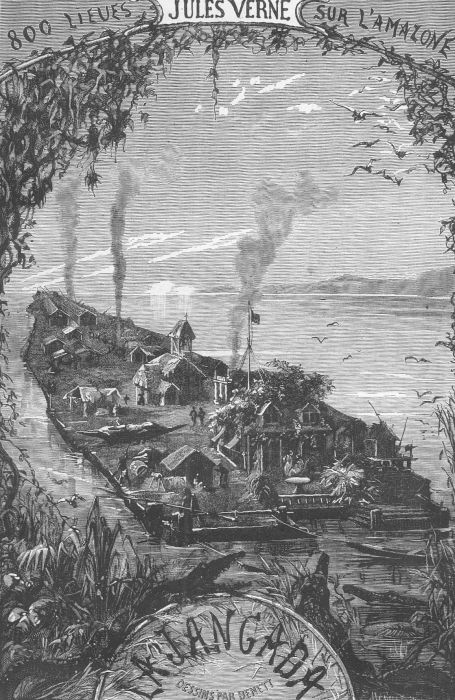
- Original illustration of Jules Verne’s Voyages Extraordinaires
- Author: Jules Verne
- Original title: La Jangada - Huit Cents lieues sur l'Amazone
- Illustrator: Léon Benett
- Language: French
- Series: The Extraordinary Voyages #21
- Genre: Adventure novel
- Publisher: Pierre-Jules Hetzel
- Publication date: 1881
- Publication place: France
- English publication date: 1881
- Media type: Print (Hardback)
- Preceded by: The Steam House
- Followed by: Godfrey Morgan

The Giant Raft (French: La Jangada - Huit Cents lieues sur l'Amazone) is a novel by Jules Verne, published in 1881. It has also been incorrectly published with the title of its first part: Eight Hundred Leagues on the Amazon.

It is an adventure novel, involving how Joam Garral, a ranch owner living near the Peruvian-Brazilian border on the Amazon River, is forced to travel downstream when his past catches up with him. Most of the novel is situated on a large jangada (a Brazilian timber raft) that is used by Garral and his family to float to Belém, at the river's mouth. Many aspects of the raft, scenery, and journey are described in detail.

It was adapted into the 1993 film Eight Hundred Leagues Down the Amazon.

== Plot summary ==
Joam Garral grants his daughter's wish to travel to Belém, where she wants to marry Manuel Valdez in the presence of Manuel's invalid mother. The Garrals travel down the Amazon River using a giant timber raft. At Belém, Joam plans to restore his good name, as he is still wanted in Brazil for a crime he did not perpetrate. A scoundrel named Torres offers Joam absolute proof of Joam's innocence, but the price that Torres wants for this information is to marry Joam's daughter, which is inconceivable to Joam. The proof is locked in an encrypted letter that would exonerate Garral. When Torres is killed, the Garral family must race to decode the letter before Joam is executed.
