= The Castaways of the Flag =

1900 novel by Jules Verne

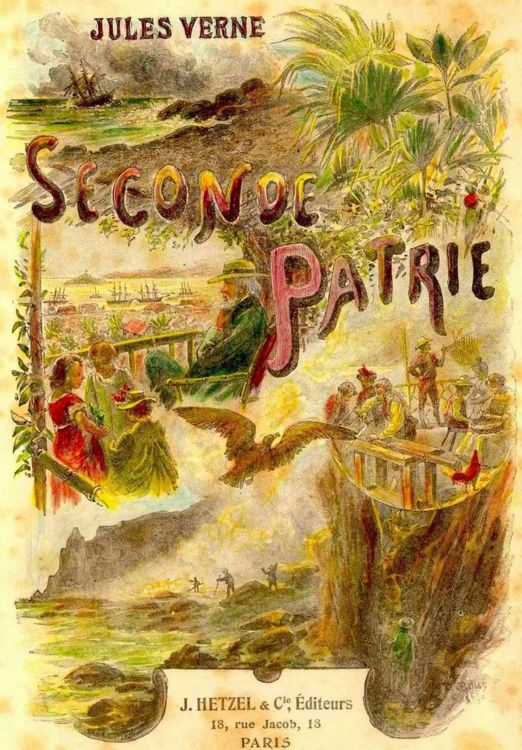
- Title page of a Hetzel edition
- Author: Jules Verne
- Original title: Seconde patrie
- Translator: Cranstoun Metcalfe
- Illustrator: Georges Roux
- Language: French
- Series: The Extraordinary Voyages #47
- Genre: Adventure novel
- Publisher: Pierre-Jules Hetzel
- Publication date: 1900
- Publication place: France
- English publication date: 1923
- Media type: Print (Hardback)
- Preceded by: The Will of an Eccentric
- Followed by: The Village in the Treetops

The Castaways of the Flag (French: Seconde patrie, lit. Second Fatherland, 1900) is an adventure novel written by Jules Verne. The two volumes of the novel were initially published in English translation as two separate volumes: Their Island Home and The Castaways of the Flag. Later reprints were published under the title The Castaways of the Flag.

The story is a sequel to the 1812 book The Swiss Family Robinson by Johann Wyss, picking up where that novel leaves off.

== Publication history ==
- May 1923, Their Island Home and The Castaways of the Flag, London: Sampson Low

== Plot summary ==
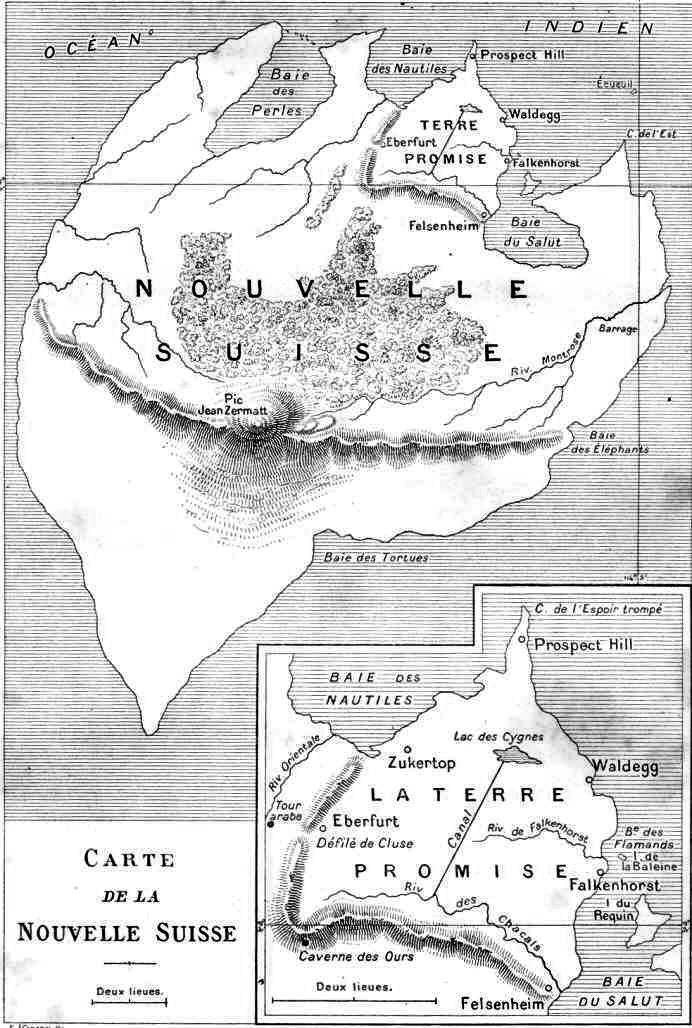
Map of "New Switzerland"

== Bibliography ==
- Title The Castaways of the Flag: The Final Adventures of the Swiss Family Robinson
- Authors Jules Verne, Johann David Wyss
- Editor S. Low, Marston, 1923
- 242 pages
