= The Mysterious Castle in the Carpathians =

- Directed by: Oldřich Lipský
- Written by: Oldřich Lipský; Jiří Brdečka
- Based on: The Carpathian Castle by Jules Verne
- Starring: Michal Dočolomanský; Rudolf Hrušínský; Vlastimil Brodský; Miloš Kopecký
- Narrated by: Otakar Brousek
- Cinematography: Viktor Růžička
- Edited by: Miroslav Hájek
- Music by: Luboš Fišer
- Production company: Filmové studio Barrandov
- Distributed by: Ústřední půjčovna filmů
- Release date: 1 October 1981
- Running time: 97 minutes
- Country: Czechoslovakia
- Language: Czech

The Mysterious Castle in the Carpathians (Czech: Tajemství hradu v Karpatech) is a 1981 Czech comedy film directed by Oldřich Lipský. It is based on Jules Verne's novel The Carpathian Castle.

== Production ==
The film marks Lipský's third and final collaboration with screenwriter Jiří Brdečka. Props were created by artist Jan Švankmajer.

== Cast ==
- Michal Dočolomanský as Count Teleke of Tölökö
- Jan Hartl as Vilja Dézi
- Miloš Kopecký as Baron Robert Gorc of Gorcena
- Rudolf Hrušínský as Professor Orfanik
- Vlastimil Brodský as Butler Ignác
- Jaroslava Kretschmerová as Myriota
- Evelyna Steimarová as Primadona Salsa Verde
- Augustín Kubáň as Servant Zutro aka Tóma Hluchoněmec
- Jan Skopeček as Frik

== See also ==
- Dinner for Adele
