= 1889 in science fiction =

The year 1889 was marked, in science fiction, by the following events.

== Births and deaths ==
=== Deaths ===
- August 19 – Auguste Villiers de l'Isle-Adam, French writer (b. 1838)

== Literary releases ==
=== Novels ===
- The Purchase of the North Pole, by Jules Verne.
- A Connecticut Yankee in King Arthur's Court, by Mark Twain.
- Urion by Camille Flammarion

=== Short stories ===
- In the Year 2889, short story by Jules Verne.

== Awards ==
The main science-fiction Awards known at the present time did not exist at that time.
