= The Survivors of the Chancellor =

1875 novel by Jules Verne

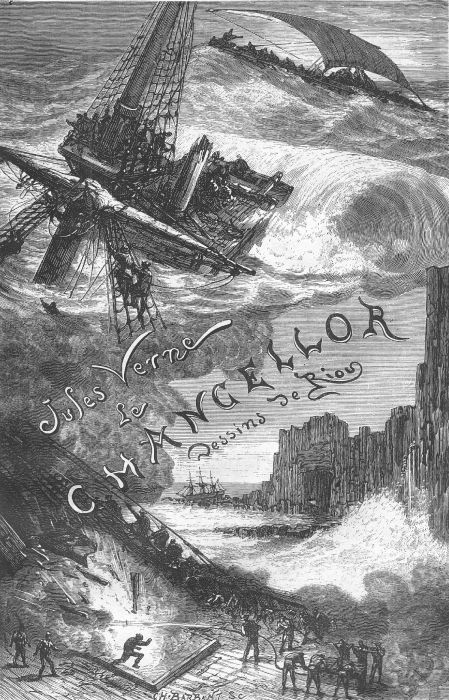
- Author: Jules Verne
- Original title: Le Chancellor
- Translator: George M. Towle
- Illustrator: Édouard Riou
- Language: French
- Series: The Extraordinary Voyages #13
- Genre: Adventure novel
- Publisher: Pierre-Jules Hetzel
- Publication date: 1875
- Publication place: France
- English publication date: 1875
- Media type: Print (Hardback)
- Preceded by: The Mysterious Island
- Followed by: Michael Strogoff

The Survivors of the Chancellor: Diary of J. R. Kazallon, Passenger (French: Le Chancellor: Journal du passager J.-R. Kazallon) is an 1875 novel written by Jules Verne about the final voyage of a British sailing ship, the Chancellor, told from the perspective of one of its passengers (in the form of a diary).

== Characters ==
At the beginning of its voyage, the Chancellor carried eight passengers and twenty crew members. By the end, only eleven people (five passengers and six crew) remained alive.

=== Passengers ===
- J.R. Kazallon, the narrator and one of the survivors.
- Mr. Kear, an American from Buffalo, is a wealthy and conceited man of about 50 years of age whose fortunes lie in the petroleum industry. Leaving behind his feverish wife, he escapes the Chancellor in a whaleboat on the night of December 5 and is not seen again (his death, given the storminess of the ocean the next morning, is implied).
- Mrs. Kear
- Miss Herbey, one of the survivors.
- M. Letourneur, one of the survivors.
- Andre Letourneur, one of the survivors.
- William Falsten, a 45-year-old English engineer from Manchester who passes much of his time aboard the Chancellor engrossed in mechanical calculations. He is one of the eleven survivors.
- John Ruby, a Welsh merchant originally of Cardiff whose sole goal in life seems to be the pursuit of profit. He loses his sanity after learning of the fire burning in the ship's hold and realizing that it could detonate the thirty pounds of potassium picrate he had brought on board the ship. He dies on October 29, burned to death after jumping into the burning cargo hold.

=== Crew ===
- John Silas Huntly, an approximately 50-year-old Scotsman of Dundee, is the captain of the Chancellor until he resigns his post to his first mate on October 23. He escapes the Chancellor in a whaleboat on the night of December 5 and is not seen again (his death, given the storminess of the ocean the next morning, is implied).
- Robert Curtis, the first mate on the Chancellor. John Silas Huntly passes over his post as captain to him on October 23 and he acts as a leader of sorts throughout the story. He survives the events.
- Lt. Walter, dies from fever.
- The boatswain
- Hobart was the steward on the ship. Kazallon describes him as being in the best health during the raft trip, and it is eventually revealed that he was hoarding bacon. On this day, January 18, he commits suicide and several sailors cannibalize his remains. Kazallon, Miss Herbey, M. Letourneur, and Andre do not partake and it is unknown if Curtis does. His remains are thrown overboard on January 19, presumably by Andre.
- Jynxstrop, a black cook. He ultimately commits suicide by jumping at the sea to be eaten by sharks.

== Timeline ==
The crew and passengers of the Chancellor are at sea for four months, from September 27, 1869 to January 27, 1870.

Note: This timeline omits any events for which the date cannot be precisely determined.

=== Onboard the Chancellor (September 27 - December 7, 1869) ===
- September 27: At three o'clock in the afternoon, the Chancellor departs Charleston, South Carolina with eight passengers, 20 crew, and 1,700 bales of cotton.
- October 7: The Chancellor arrives at latitude 32°20' N and longitude 64°50' W, not far off the coast of Bermuda.
- October 11: The Chancellor enters the Sargasso Sea.
- October 14: In early morning, the crew discovers a fire in the cargo hold; the passengers remain unaware. The Chancellor arrives at latitude 21° 33' N and longitude 50° 17' W.
- October 21: J.R. Kazallon, William Falsten, and Robert Curtis (the first mate) learn that John Ruby had smuggled thirty pounds of potassium picrate into the ship's hold. All passengers become aware of the fire burning inside the ship after Ruby's outburst of ''Fire on board! Fire! Fire!''.
- October 23: Captain John Silas Huntly resigns his post; Curtis, the first mate, becomes captain.
- October 29: Flames from the fire shoot through the deck. Shortly before midnight, the Chancellor runs aground on a reef.
  - John Ruby dies after plunging into the burning hold through an open hatchway.
- October 30: The ocean waves flood the ship's hold and begin to extinguish the fire; repairs on the ship commence.
- October 31: Andre Letourneur proposes to name the newly discovered reef ''Ham Rock''.
- November 6: The fire in the Chancellor's cargo hold is extinguished.
- November 8: In a combined effort, the crew and passengers commence unloading the cotton into the ocean.
- November 20: Repairs to the Chancellor are completed.
- November 24: The Chancellor departs ''Ham Rock''.
- November 30: At about two o'clock in the morning, a sailor discovers two feet of water in the hold. The water rises to three feet by daybreak.
- December 1: The water inside the hold is at five feet.
- December 3: The water inside the hold is at six feet.
- December 4: Curtis, the captain, decides to abandon ship. Construction on a raft commences. The Chancellor stops sinking with the deck now two feet underwater. Near eleven o'clock at night, the ropes holding the uncompleted raft snap and it goes adrift.
- December 5: The Chancellor is now approximately at latitude 16° N. The hull is three-fourths submerged.
- December 6: Near eight o'clock in the morning, the boatswain discovers that the whaleboat is missing, along with Mr. Kear, John Silas Huntly, and three sailors. They escaped late the previous evening and their exact fate remains unknown (they are presumed to perish in the stormy waters).
  - At five o'clock, Mrs. Kear dies after experiencing (over the past three days) drowsiness, exhaustion, and fever.
- December 7: The construction of the second raft is completed. After eight o'clock in the morning, the Chancellor sinks after more than 70 days at sea.
  - At seven o'clock in the morning, two sailors and an apprentice drown after jumping overboard as the newly completed raft begins drifting away from the foundering ship.

=== Onboard the raft (December 7, 1869 - January 27, 1870) ===
- December 7: The position of the raft is calculated as about latitude 15° 07' N and longitude 49° 35' W, approximately 650 miles northeast of Paramaribo in Dutch Guiana.
- December 17: Sharks begin following the drifting raft.
- December 22: A powerful storm ravages the occupants of the raft washing overboard two sailors as well as all of their meat and fish provisions.
  - At around three o'clock in the morning, two sailors (Austin and O'Ready) are washed overboard and perish in the storm.
- January 1: The last of the food provisions brought on board the raft from the Chancellor are exhausted.
- January 5: At six o'clock in the morning, a struggle takes place between six drunken crewmen led by Owen and Curtis, the boatswain, Dowlas, and some of the passengers. One of the mutineering sailors, Wilson, dies after being struck in the chest by a hatchet wielded by Curtis, and the mutiny is suppressed.
- January 7: At about half-past seven in the evening, Lt. Walter dies of tuberculosis ("consumption").
- January 8: Before daylight, Curtis and Kazallon throw the body of Lt. Walter overboard, but not before discovering the right foot missing. Kazallon discovers later that night that the boatswain had cut off the foot for bait.
- January 10: Owen falls ill from copper oxide poisoning after secretly drinking from the previously untouched barrel of fresh water.
- January 11: Owen dies from copper oxide poisoning and his body is thrown overboard.
- January 13 or 14: At about eleven o'clock, Curtis and the boatswain sight a ship twelve miles from the raft. However, after the passage of several hours and despite the efforts of the raft's occupants (starting a fire aboard the raft), the ship disappears across the horizon.
- January 18: Hobart commits suicide by hanging sometime before dawn after Kazallon snatched away and ate a piece of bacon the steward had been (secretly) hiding away. To assuage their hunger, the sailors and Falsten proceed to cannibalize the body (Mr. Kazallon, Miss Herbey, Andre, and M. Letorneur do not join in; whether Curtis does is unknown).
- January 19 or 20: The uneaten remains of Hobart are thrown overboard (presumably by Andre) during the night.
- January 22: In a fit of madness, Jynxstrop jumps off the raft and is eaten by the circling sharks.
- January 26: At ten o'clock in the morning, Dowlas proposes that lots be drawn to determine who will be eaten by the rest. In the ensuing commotion Mr. Kazallon falls overboard and discovers that the water is fresh. The raft has entered the mouth of Amazon River.

== References to the novel ==
- In season four of the TV series Lost, a minor character named Regina is shown reading The Survivors of the Chancellor.
- In the movie Hawaii, Eugenio gives Martin a Spanish translation of the book, “El Chancellor” to read.

== Footnotes ==
1. In chapter XXX, Jules Verne writes that the Chancellor had been at sea 72 days before sinking. However, the actual length of its voyage is less than 71 days (it sailed only nine hours on September 27 and was afloat only eight hours on December 7). The precise length of the voyage is either 70 days, 17 hours (if the ship sank at 8:00 Charleston time) or 70 days, 15 hours (if the ship sank at 8:00 local time in the UTC-3 time zone, which would be 6:00 in Charleston, which is located in the UTC-5 time zone).
