= The Flight to France =

Book by Jules Verne

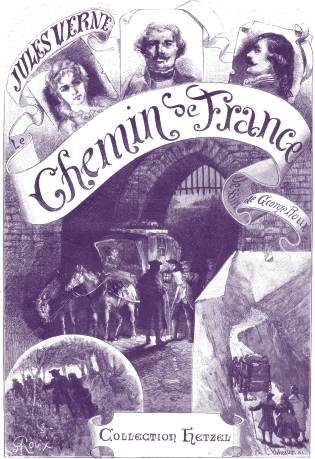
- Author: Jules Verne
- Original title: Le Chemin de France
- Illustrator: Georges Roux
- Language: French
- Series: The Extraordinary Voyages #31
- Genre: Adventure novel
- Publisher: Pierre-Jules Hetzel
- Publication date: 1887
- Publication place: France
- English publication date: 1888
- Media type: Print (Hardback)
- Preceded by: North Against South
- Followed by: Two Years' Vacation

The Flight to France (French: Le Chemin de France, 1887) is an adventure novel written by Jules Verne. Set in the year 1792 just before the French Revolutionary Wars, the novel follows fictional French Army Captain Natalis Delpierre. Several English language editions were published with the subtitle, The Flight to France; or, The Memoirs of a Dragoon. A Tale of the Day of Dumouriez.

== Publication history ==
- 1888, UK, London: Sampson Low, Marston, Searle, & Rivington, 231 pp., First UK edition
- 1889, USA, New York: New York, G. Munro, 158 pp., First United States edition
