= Family Without a Name =

1889 novel by Jules Verne

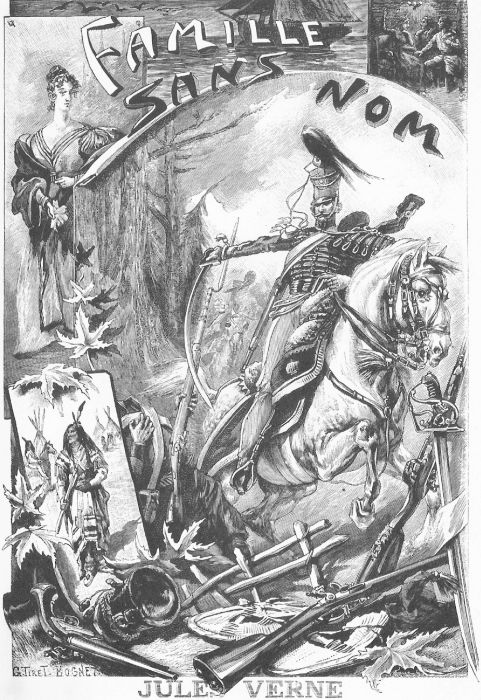
- Author: Jules Verne
- Original title: Famille-sans-nom
- Illustrator: Georges Tiret-Bognet
- Language: French
- Series: The Extraordinary Voyages #33
- Genre: Adventure novel
- Publisher: Pierre-Jules Hetzel
- Publication date: 1889
- Publication place: France
- English publication date: 1889
- Media type: Print (Hardback)
- Preceded by: Two Years' Vacation
- Followed by: The Purchase of the North Pole

Family Without a Name (French: Famille-sans-nom) is an 1889 adventure novel by Jules Verne about the life of a family in Lower Canada (present-day Quebec) during the Lower Canada Rebellion of 1837 and 1838 that sought an independent and democratic republic for Lower Canada. In the book, the two sons of a traitor fight in the Rebellion in an attempt to make up for the crime of their father.

== Publication history ==
- 1889, USA, New York: J.W. Lovell Co, Pub date 1889; first United States edition, as A Family Without a Name
- 1889, USA, New York: Munro, Pub date 1889; as A Family Without a Name
- 1890, UK, London: Sampson Low, Pub date 1890; first UK edition, as A Family Without a Name
- 1963, UK, London: Arco, Pub date 1963; abridged and edited by I.O. Evans in 2 volumes as Leader of the Resistance and Into the Abyss
- 1982, Canada, Toronto: NC Press ISBN 0-919601-86-3, Pub date 1982; new translation by Edward Baxter

== Popular culture ==
The 1978 edition, published at the French publishing house of the Union générale d'éditions, displayed upon the cover the mention "Pour un Québec libre" (For a Free Quebec). This was a decade after the Vive le Québec libre speech of French President Charles de Gaulle, two years after the first election of a contemporary independence party in Quebec, the Parti Québécois, and two years before their promised referendum on independence occurred in 1980. Lévesque had also made an important state visit to France a year before.
