= The Danube Pilot =

Novel by Jules Verne

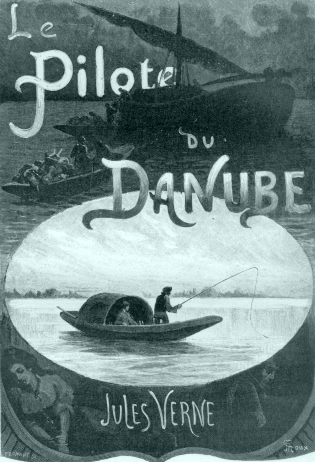
- Cover illustration of the novel.
- Author: Jules Verne
- Original title: Le Pilote du Danube
- Language: French
- Published: 1908 (posthumously)
- Publication place: France
- English publication date: 1967

The Danube Pilot (French: Le Pilote du Danube) is a novel by Jules Verne.

It was first published in 1908, three years after his death, and like most of the books published posthumously, had been extensively revised by his son, Michel. Part of the Voyages Extraordinaires series, it recounts the adventures of the lead character, Serge Ladko, a prize winner in the Danubian League of Amateur Fishermen, as he travels down the river. Jules' original title for this story was "Le Beau Danube Jaune". The original novel was published by Jules Verne Society (Société Jules Verne) in 1988.

== Bibliography ==
- Verne, Jules. The Danube Pilot (The Fitzroy Edition). Associated Booksellers, 1970. 190 pages.
