= The Chase of the Golden Meteor =

1908 novel by Jules Verne

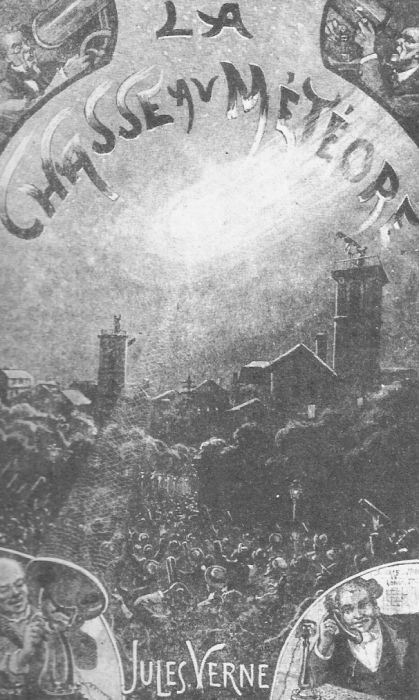
- Cover illustration of the novel.
- Author: Jules Verne
- Original title: La Chasse au météore
- Language: French
- Genre: science fiction
- Published: 1908 (posthumous)
- Publication place: France
- English publication date: 1908

The Chase of the Golden Meteor (French: La Chasse au météore) is a novel by Jules Verne. It was one of the last novels written by the prolific French hard science fiction pioneer. The book, however, is seen as less an early example of hard science fiction than a social satire lampooning greed, monomania and vanity. Verne first wrote La Chasse au météore in 1901 and then rewrote it before his death, but it was only published in 1908, three years after the author's death, one of seven such posthumous novels.

It concerns the rivalry between two amateur astronomers in the same small American town who spot a new meteor and attempt to claim the credit for themselves. The meteor turns out to be made of gold and thus extremely valuable. Another eccentric amateur scientist, this time an inventor, creates a device which will cause it to fall where he chooses.

The book was extensively edited by Verne's son, Michel Verne, who is known to have introduced the character of the inventor, emphasised the romantic sub plot of this novel and expanded it from 17 to 21 chapters, among other changes.

The future world depicted in the book includes two political predictions which failed to materialise in the century since its publication: firstly, the United States comes to be composed of 51 states and accordingly, its flag has 51 stars, as opposed to the 45 states that existed in 1905 when Verne died; secondly, Greenland becomes an independent, fully sovereign nation state.

== Publication history ==
In November, 1908 Grant Richards (London) published the first English translation as The Chase of the Golden Meteor from the version of Michel Verne, in a fully illustrated edition.

In 1965 I.O. Evans published a condensed version in the Fitzroy Edition as The Hunt for the Meteor.

In 1986 the Société Jules Verne published the original French version.

In 1998 Bison Books, University of Nebraska Press, republished The Chase of the Golden Meteor in a fully illustrated replica version of the Grant Richards version with an introduction by Gregory A. Benford.

In 2006 The Meteor Hunt was published by Bison Books, University of Nebraska Press translated by F. P. Walter and Walter James Miller from the original text by Jules Verne.
