= George Roux =

French artist and book illustrator

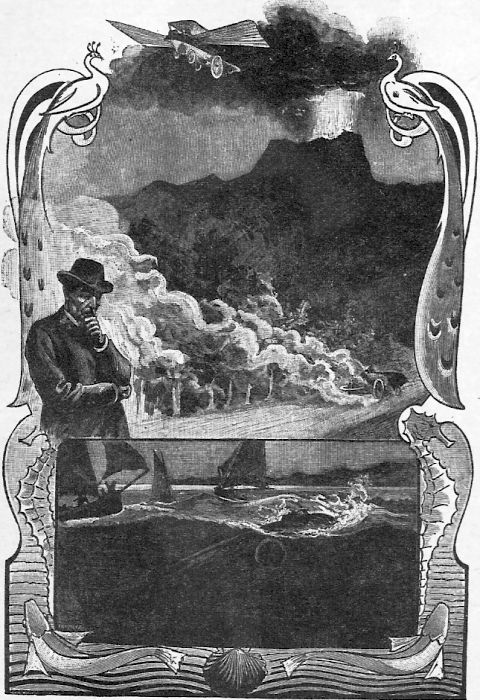
Illustration by Roux for J. Verne's Master of the World, 1903

George Roux (1853–1929) was a French artist and book illustrator. His best-known works today are a large number of illustrations he created for the science-fiction novels of Jules Verne, in the series Les voyages extraordinaires. He was the second-most prolific illustrator of Verne's novels, after Léon Benett, drawing the illustrations for 22 novels in the original editions of Verne's works with the publisher Pierre-Jules Hetzel. The first of them was L’Épave du Cynthia (The Salvage of the Cynthia, 1885) and the last was L'Étonnante aventure de la mission Barsac (The Barsac Mission, 1919).

He also illustrated André Laurie's Axel Ebersen, the Graduate of Upsala published in instalments in volume 14 (1981–2) of the Boy's Own Paper.
