= Léon Benett =

French painter and illustrator

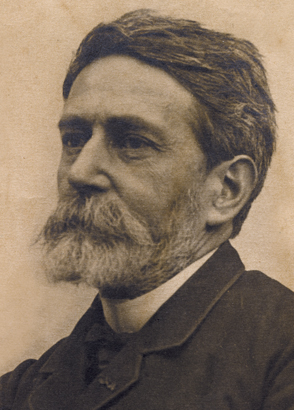
Léon Benett

Léon Benett (born Hippolyte Léon Benet; 1839–1916) was a French painter and illustrator. He was born in Orange, Provence. He changed his name to "Léon Benett" to differentiate his career in the French administration from his work as a draftsman.

Benett is the most important illustrator of books written by Jules Verne; between 1873 and 1910 he illustrated twenty-five novels from the Voyages Extraordinaires series. He also illustrated other books by Verne.

He also illustrated works of Victor Hugo, Leo Tolstoy, Thomas Mayne Reid, André Laurie, Camille Flammarion, and others. Benett's illustrations often depict exotic countries, arising from his real experiences as a government employee in which he visited Algeria, Cochinchina, Martinique, and New Caledonia.

He died in Toulon on 7 December 1916.

== Bibliography ==
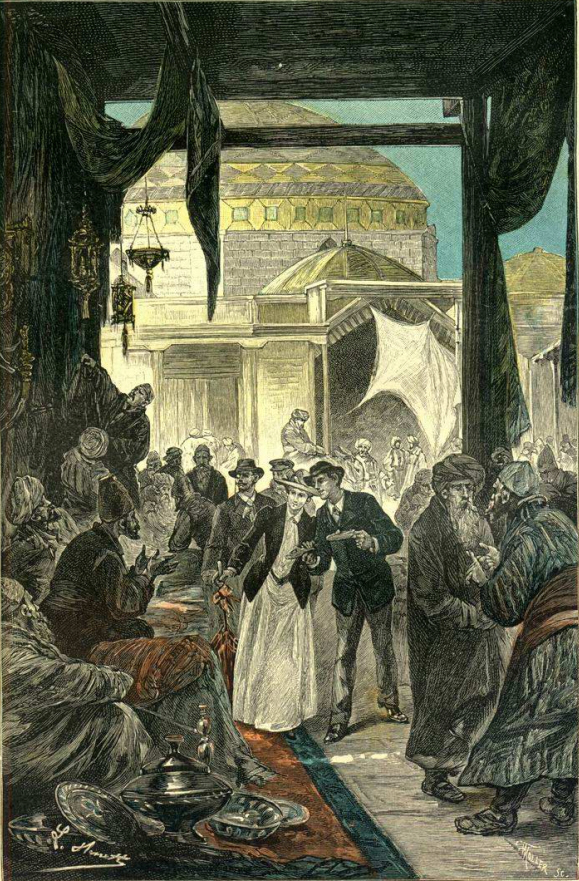
Bazaar in Samarkand, illustration by Léon Benett for a Jules Verne novel

- Fr. Benet, M.-A. Benet, P. Benet, P. Martin, R. Pesle, V. Sper Benet, Léon Benett illustrateur: Lettres et dessins inédits, A la frontière, 2011, ISBN 978-2-918665-01-4, www.leonbenett.fr
- Federico Ferretti, 2012 Elisée Reclus, lettres de prison et d'exil, Lardy, A la frontière.
