= Towle (surname) =

Towle is a surname. Notable people with the surname include:

- Andy Towle (born 1967), American blogger
- Arthur Lucan (born Arthur Towle, 1885–1954), English comedy actor
- Charles L. Towle (1913–1990), American philatelist
- Charlotte Towle (1896–1966), American social worker, academic and writer
- Clifton Cappie Towle (1888–1946), Australian anthropologist
- Edward Towle Brooks (1830–1897), Quebec lawyer, judge and political figure
- Eunice Makepeace Towle (1806–1894), American portrait painter
- Francis Towle (1876–1951), British businessman
- George Makepeace Towle (1841–1893), American lawyer, politician, and author
- John D. Towle (1804–1887), American architect
- John R. Towle (1924–1944), United States Army soldier
- Katherine Amelia Towle (1898–1986), American Marine colonel, first Director of Women Marines
- Kerry Towle (born c. 1974), Canadian politician
- Margaret Ashley-Towle (1902–1985), American archaeologist
- Mark Towle (born 1962), American car mechanic and restorer
- Mark Towle, defendant in the DC Comics v. Mark Towle copyright case
- Mary Rutter Towle (1876-1953), one of the first women to become a federal prosecutor
- Max Towle (1889–1969), American football player and coach
- Philip Towle (born 1945), British academic
- Steve Towle (born 1953), American football player
- Sydney Towle (1999–2026), American internet personality
- Thomas Towle (1887–1983), American aircraft designer in charge of developing the Ford Trimotor
- Thomas Graham Towle, Australian convicted for the Cardross road crash
- Thurston Towle (1905–1960), American football player
- Tony Towle (born 1939), American poet
