= List of people from Butte, Montana =

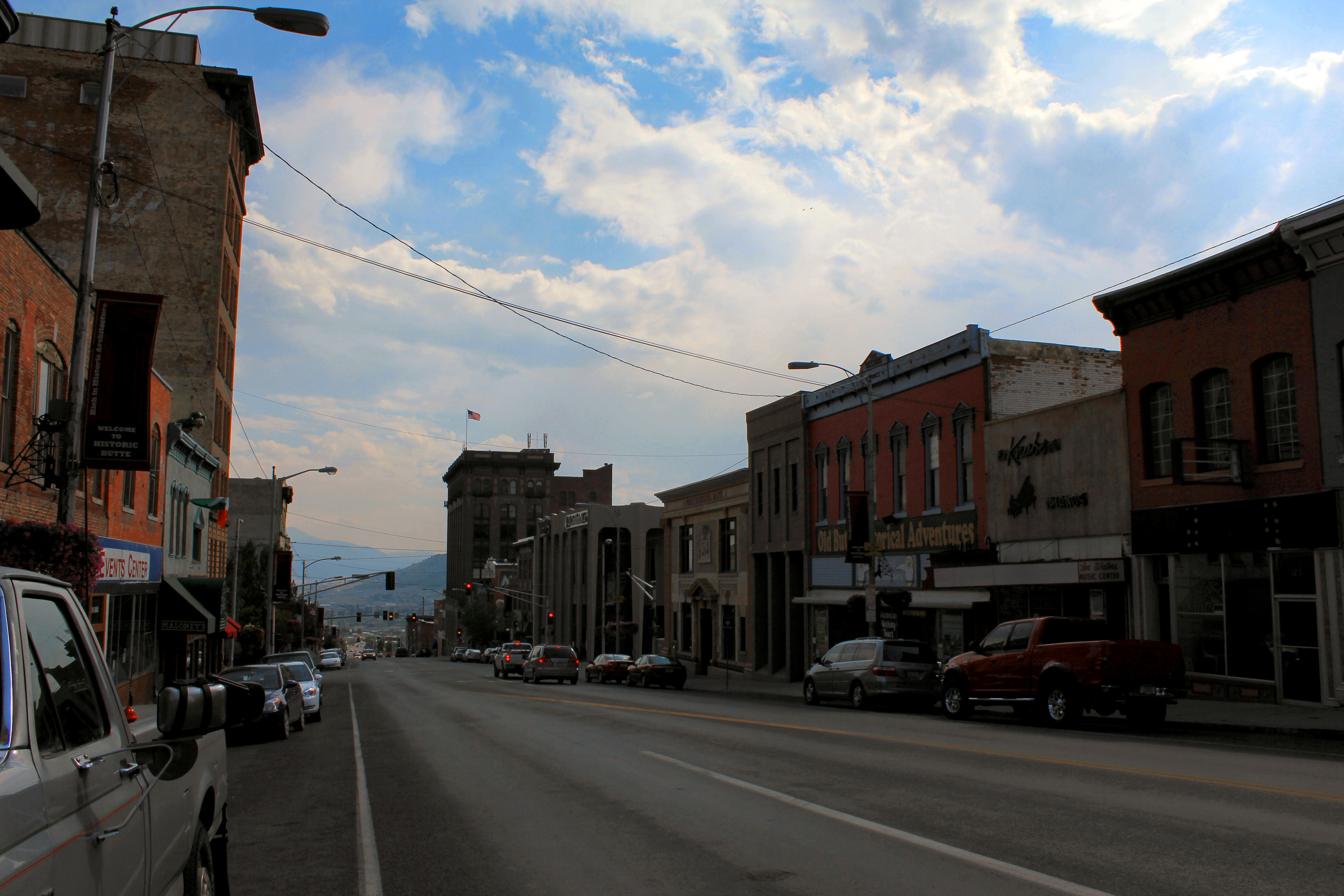
Uptown Butte

The following is a list of people from Butte, Montana, including notable persons who were born and/or have resided in Butte.

- (B) indicates that the person was born in Butte.

== A ==
- Colt Anderson, NFL defensive back (B)
- Eden Atwood, jazz vocalist
- Rudy Autio, ceramist, sculptor (B)

== B ==
- John Banovich, artist (B)
- Mary Bard, author (B)
- Lauretta Bender, pioneering neuropsychologist (B)
- John W. Bonner, governor of Montana (B)
- Rosemarie Bowe, actress (B)
- Patricia Briggs, fantasy author (B)
- Myron Brinig, writer
- Mark Britton, internet executive, venture capitalist and lawyer (B)
- Scott Brow, MLB pitcher (B)
- John Francis Buckley, member of the House of Commons of Canada (B)
- Daniel Bukvich, composer; faculty, University of Idaho Moscow (B)

== C ==
- Albert J. Campbell, United States representative from Montana
- Kathryn Card, actress (B)
- William Andrews Clark, copper magnate and politician
- William Andrews Clark Jr., philanthropist, founder of Los Angeles Philharmonic
- Amanda Curtis, Montana House of Representatives

== D ==
- Yamuna Devi (Joan Agnes Campanella)
- John Duykers, operatic tenor (B)

== E ==
- Barbara Ehrenreich, author (B)
- Julian Eltinge, actor and female impersonator
- J. R. Eyerman, photographer

== F ==
- Herb Flemming, jazz trombonist (B)
- Henry Frank, businessman and Butte mayor

== G ==
- Roger Grimsby, anchor for news on WABC-TV and WNBC TV (B)
- George F. Grant, innovative fly tier, author, and conservationist
- Kirby Grant, actor (B)
- Karla M. Gray, chief justice of the Montana Supreme Court, worked in Butte

== H ==
- Dashiell Hammett, author (The Maltese Falcon), once worked for Pinkerton National Detective Agency
- Bobby Hauck, college football coach
- Tim Hauck, NFL defensive back, coach (B)
- John Haughm, musician and artist
- F. Augustus Heinze, copper magnate
- Sonny Holland, football coach and player

== J ==
- Sam Jankovich, football player, coach, administrator (B)
- Keith Jardine, mixed martial artist (B)
- Solon Johnson, miner, prospector and former Wisconsin legislator
- Rob Johnson, MLB catcher
- Helmi Juvonen, artist (B)

== K ==
- Pat Kearney, late KXLF-TV newscaster, author and historian (B)
- Evel Knievel, motorcycle daredevil (B)
- Robbie Knievel, motorcycle daredevil, son of Evel Knievel (B)
- Ella J. Knowles Haskell, first woman to practice law in Montana

== L ==
- Ethan Laidlaw, actor (B)
- Robert C. Lautman, photographer (B)
- Rose Hum Lee, sociologist (B)
- Andrea Leeds, actress (B)
- Levi Leipheimer, Olympic cycling medalist, two-time U.S. champion (B)
- Frank Little, union leader lynched in Butte
- Paul B. Lowney, humorist, author of At Another Time — Growing up in Butte (B)
- Sonny Lubick, football coach at Colorado State University 1993-2007 (B)

== M ==
- Jack McAuliffe, former Green Bay Packers halfback (B)
- Donald McCaig, writer (B)
- Betty MacDonald, humor writer
- Michael McFaul, Oxford scholar, Stanford University professor, and former US ambassador to Russia
- Mike McGrath, Montana attorney general (B)
- Mary MacLane, feminist author and "Wild Woman of Butte"
- Mike Mansfield, U.S. senator from Montana, longest-serving Senate Majority Leader and former US ambassador to Japan
- Lee Mantle, United States senator from Montana
- Judy Martz, Olympic speed skater and governor of Montana
- Donald W. Molloy, U.S. district judge (B)
- Joseph P. Monaghan, United States representative from Montana (B)

== O ==
- Bob O'Billovich, American gridiron football player and coach (B)
- Jerry J. O'Connell, politician (B)
- Pat Ogrin, American football player (B)
- Arnold Olsen, politician (B)
- Robert J. O'Neill, US Navy SEAL (B)

== P ==
- Jean Parker, actress (B)
- Aaron Parrett, musician and professor (B)
- Erin Popovich, Paralympic swimmer
- Milt Popovich, American football player (B)

== R ==
- Jacob S. Raisin, rabbi
- Bernard Ramm, theologian (B)
- Martha Raye, film and television actress, singer (B)
- John E. Rickards, first lieutenant governor of Montana
- Fritzi Ridgeway, actress
- William Rockefeller, financier
- A. J. Rosier, Wyoming state senator
- Jim Rotondi, jazz trumpeter, composer, educator (B)

== S ==
- Michael Sells, professor of Islamic Studies at the University of Chicago (B)
- Brian Sullivan, member of the Washington House of Representatives (B)
- Jim Sweeney, former head football coach at Washington State University and longtime head coach at Fresno State University (B)

== T ==
- Montana Taylor, pianist (B)
- George Leo Thomas, Bishop of Helena
- Jacob Thorkelson, United States representative from Montana
- Charlotte Towle, academic and social worker (B)
- Robert Tryon, behavioral psychologist (B)

== V ==
- Wayne S. Vucinich, historian and academic (B)

== W ==
- John Walsh, former lieutenant governor of Montana, United States senator and adjutant general of the Montana National Guard (B)
- Jack Weyland, physicist, academic (B)
- Burton K. Wheeler, United States senator from Montana
- Griff Williams, painter (B)
- Kathlyn Williams, actress (B)
- Bryon Wilson, skier, Olympic bronze medalist (B)

== See also ==
- History of Butte, Montana
