= Parrette =

Parrette is a surname. Notable people with the surname include:

- Paul R. Parrette (1906–1980), American businessman
- Vinx De'Jon Parrette (born 1957), American percussionist, singer, songwriter, and athlete

== See also ==
- Parrett (surname)
- Parretti
