= Émile Küss =

French physician (1815–1871)

Professor Émile Küss
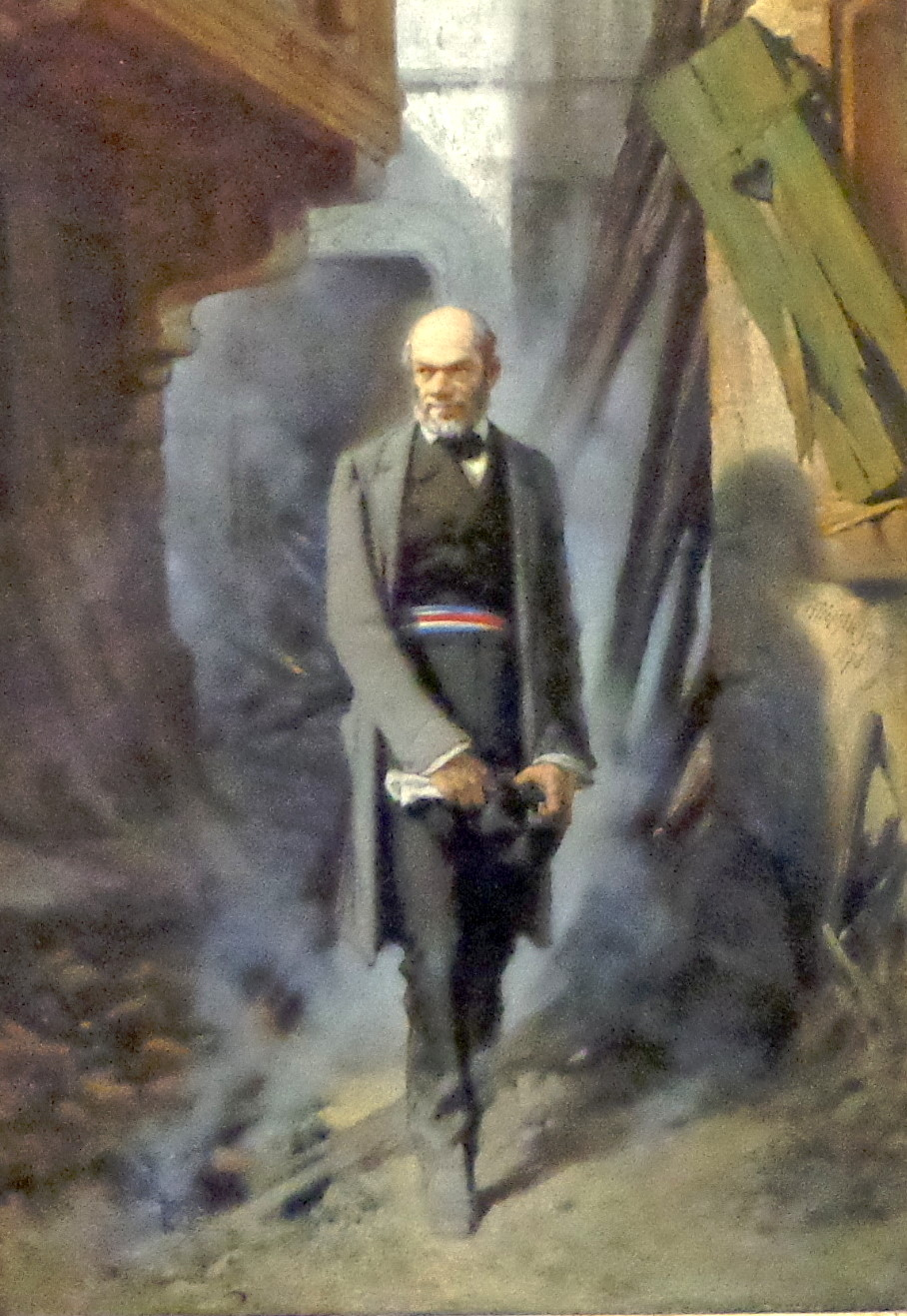
- Le maire Küss au milieu des ruines de Strasbourg. Théophile Schuler, 1873 (detail).
- Born: 1 February 1815
- Died: 1 March 1871 (aged 56); Bordeaux, France
- Occupation: Physician
- Known for: First tumour biopsy

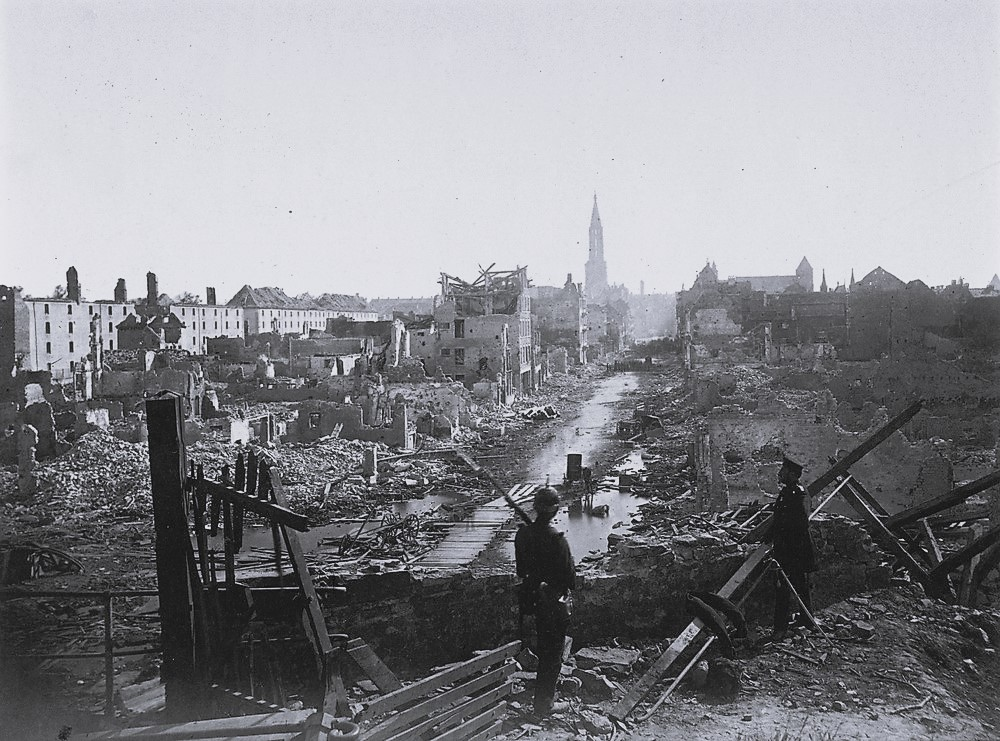
Strasbourg in September 1870 after the end of the siege

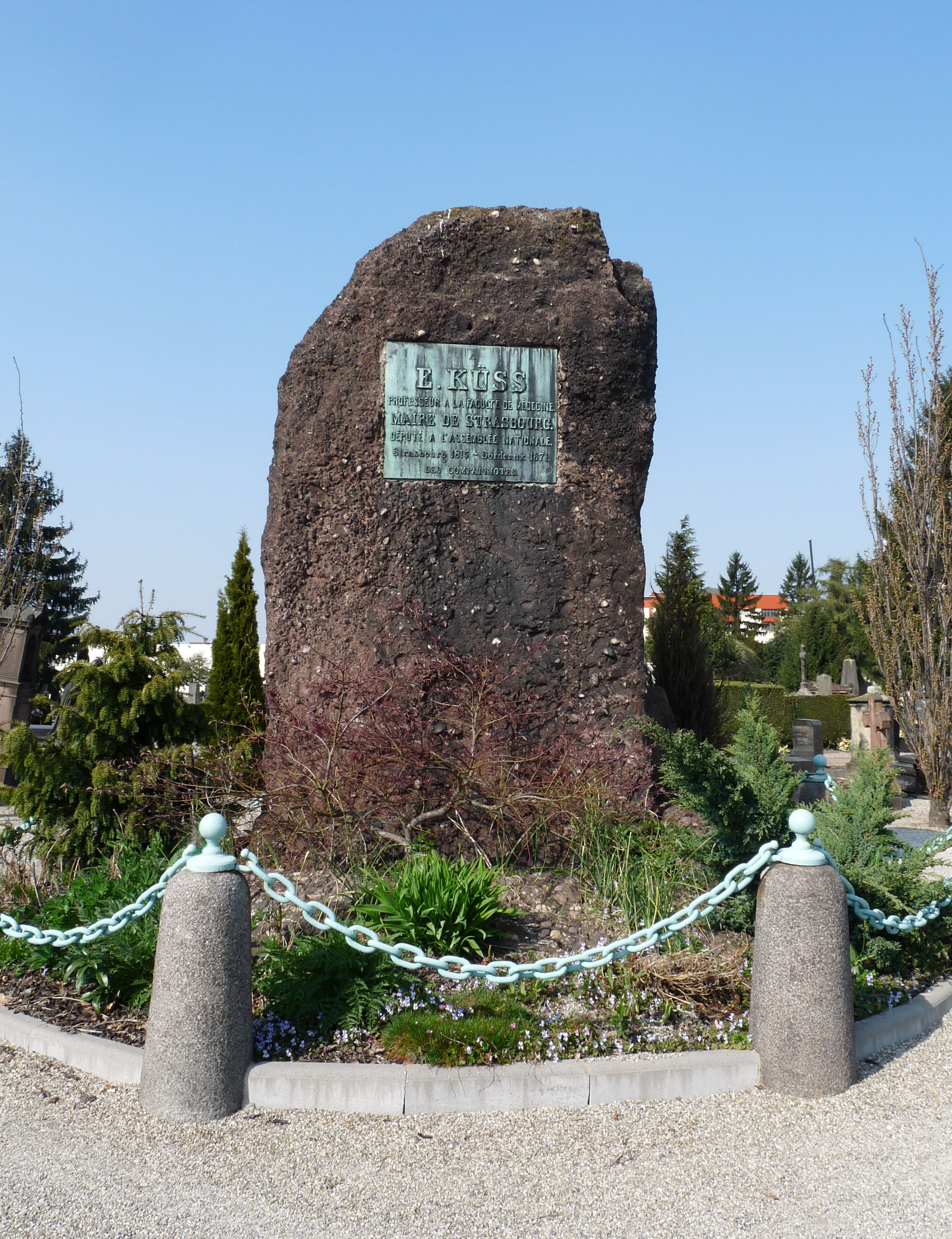
Émile Küss monument

Émile Küss (1 February 1815 – 1 March 1871) was a French medical doctor who, with Charles-Emmanuel Sédillot, performed the first recorded biopsy on a tumour. He later entered politics in Strasbourg, became mayor, and played a significant role in the decision of the city leaders to surrender to the Germans in 1870 following the Siege of Strasbourg in the Franco-Prussian War.

== Early life and family ==
Émile Küss was born in 1815 into "an ancient bourgeois family" of Strasbourg. He was educated at the Protestant Gymnasium in Strasbourg and studied anatomy.

A grandson of his nephew Edouard Küss, son of his brother Théodore, was the surgeon René Küss.

== Medical career ==
Küss was appointed head of anatomical studies at the University of Strasbourg in 1843 and professor of physiology in 1846. His large family meant that he always needed money and he lectured regularly and gave classes on anatomical drawing despite a pulmonary infection that meant he was sometimes bedridden.

=== Cancer research ===
The cell theory of Matthias Schleiden and Theodor Schwann (1838/39) generated a debate about the behaviour of cancer cells, the use of the microscope, and its relevance to cancer diagnosis. Not all pathologists believed that cancer cells were distinctive or that cancer could be diagnosed by looking at a collection of cells (histology) rather than individual cells (cytology). The definition of cancer did not incorporate its morphological features until many years later. It had instead relied on looking solely at the spread of the cancer, that is, its "ability to invade locally and metastasize".

Émile Küss and Charles-Emmanuel Sédillot were amongst the few who believed that cancer cells could be recognised by how they looked under the microscope, as described by Adolph Hannover in 1843. They published their research on microscopic diagnosis in Recherches sur le cancer in 1846 and by 1847 they were performing punch biopsies of tumours using a specially designed instrument, as described by Küss:

On plunging this instrument into a tumor to any depth, we can extract a minute portion of the tissue of which its various layers are composed. In this manner a microscopic examination of the tumor can be practiced on the living subject, and its nature ascertained before having recourse to an operation.

They have been described as pioneers in histopathology, and according to pathologist and historian James R. Wright, carried out "the first surgical biopsies, predating Carl Ruge, generally considered the father of biopsy, by more than 30 years."

== Politics ==
Küss was a committed republican who opposed the Second Republic (1848–1852) of Napoleon III and twice refused the Legion of Honor. He was a leading figure locally in the 1848 June revolution. Along with many others, he was arrested when Bonaparte overturned the Second Republic in December 1851, but was acquitted of all charges by a court in Metz.

He re-entered politics in 1869 to campaign for Charles Boersch who later became prefect of Strasbourg while he was mayor, and in 1870 he argued against Napoleon III's plebiscite. He was idolised by young republicans in the city for his uncompromising approach to the Empire.

Küss became mayor of Strasbourg on 14 September 1870 and soon after argued that the city should surrender to the Germans following the Siege of Strasbourg in the Franco-Prussian War to save life and because the situation was hopeless.

== Death and legacy ==
Küss died in Bordeaux on 1 March 1871.

In 1873, he was pictured walking through the ruins of Strasbourg in a painting by Théophile Schuler. Two streets are named after Küss; Rue Küss in the 13th arrondissement of Paris, and Rue du Maire Küss in Strasbourg. Pont du Maire Kuss in Strasbourg also bears his name.

== Gallery ==
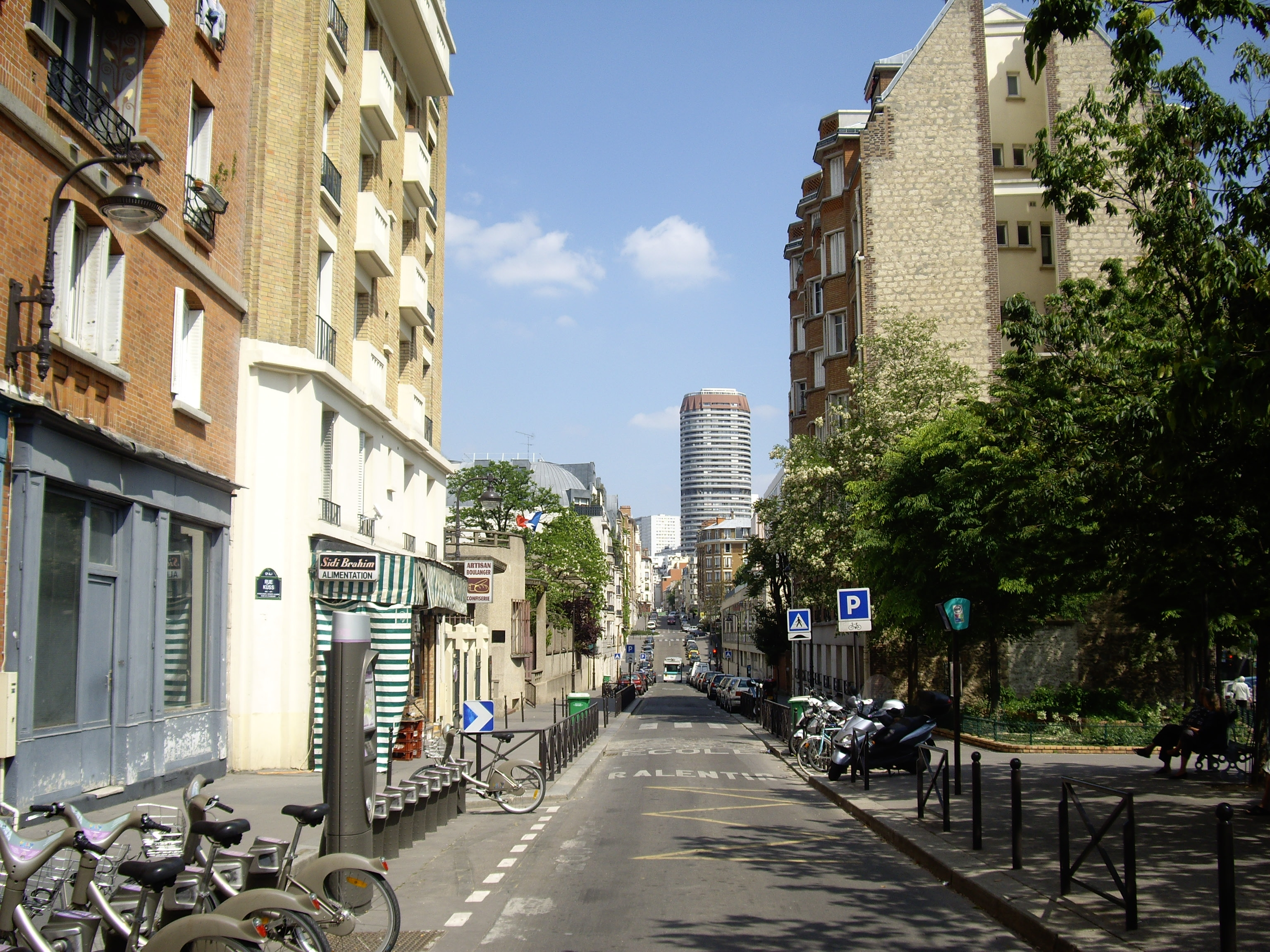
Rue Küss, Paris

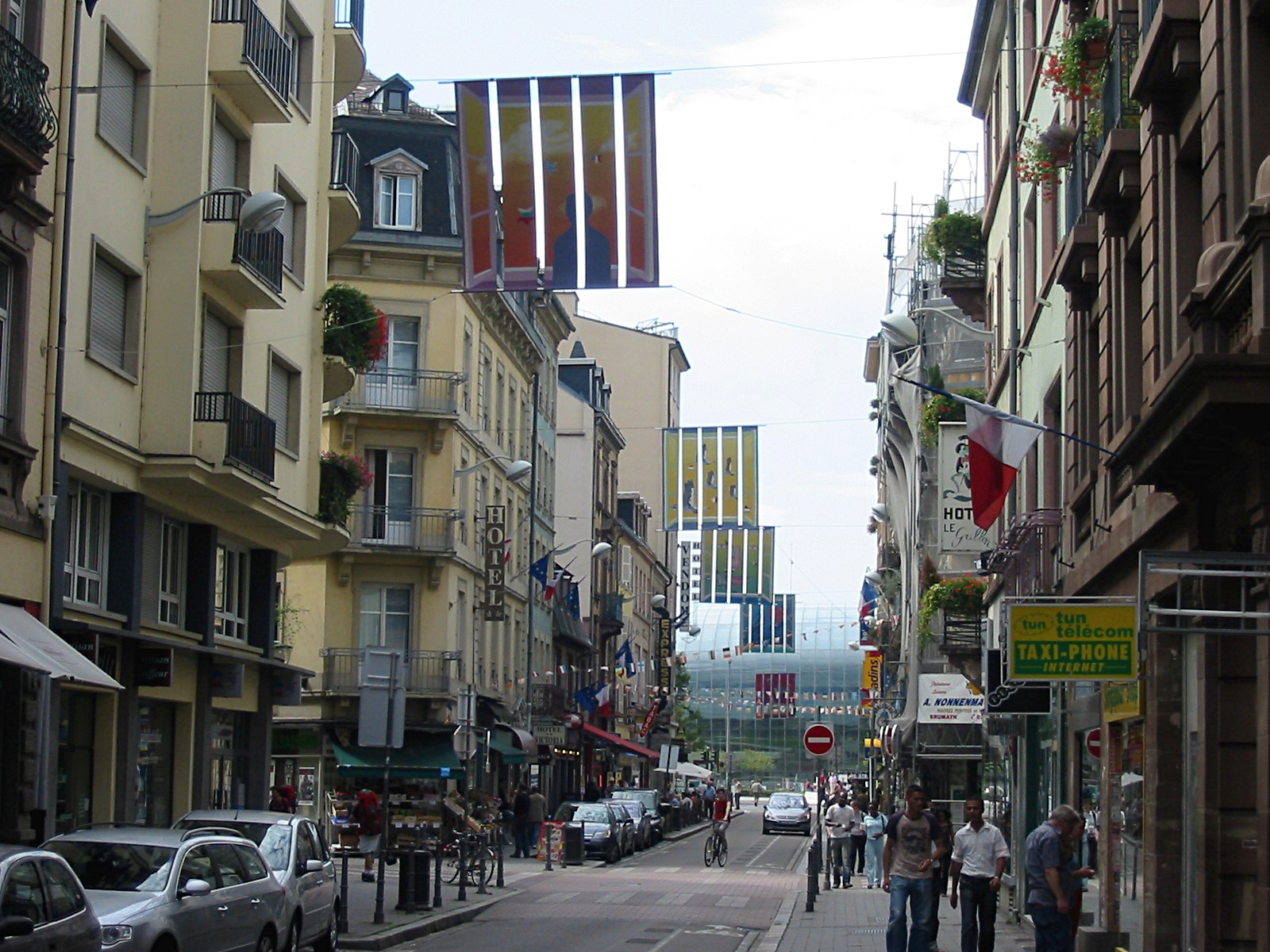
Rue du Maire Küss, Strasbourg

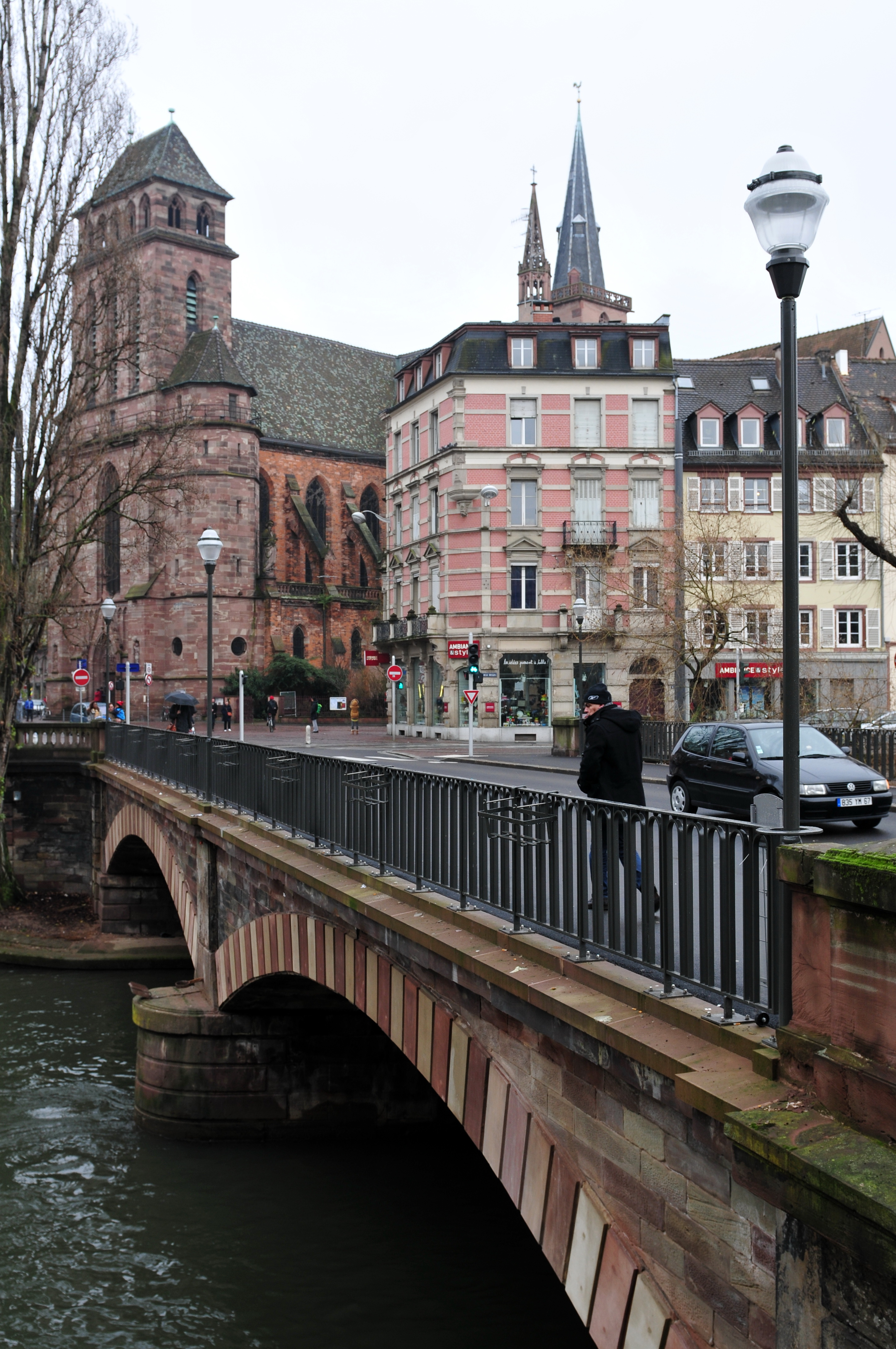
Pont du Maire Kuss, Strasbourg

== Selected publications ==
- Questions sur diverses branches des sciences médicales . Strasbourg, 1841.
- De l'emploi du caustique en chirurgie. Strasbourg, 1844.
- De la vascularite et de l'inflammation. Treuttel et Würtz, Strasbourg, 1846.
- Appréciation générale des progrès de la physiologie depuis Bichat, [Thèse présentée et soutenue devant le jury. Concours pour la chaire de physiologie ouvert à la Faculté de Médecine de Strasbourg], Impr. L.F. Le Roux, 1846, 57 p.
- Cours de physiologie professé à la Faculté de Médecine de Strasbourg, par É. Küss, rédigé par le Docteur Mathias Duval, J.-B. Baillière et fils (Paris), 1872 (plusieurs éd. ultérieures), XXXV-575 p. (avec une Notice sur le Professeur Küss).
- Cours de physiologie, d'après l'enseignement du professeur Küss, publié par le Dr Mathias Duval, 2nd edition, complétée par l'exposé des travaux les plus récents, Baillière (Paris), 1873, available at Gallica; Traduction en anglais par Robert Amaury, Campbell, Boston, 1876 : A course of Lectures in Physiology as delivered by Professor Küss, Texte intégral; traduction en espagnol par Jaime Mitjavila y Ribas : Curso de Fisiología según la enseñanza del Profesor Küss. Con prologo de Ramón Coll y Pujol, Imp. Lázaro Maroto, Madrid, 1876.
- Cours de physiologie, d'après l'enseignement du professeur Küss, publié par le Dr Mathias Duval, 3rd edition, supplemented by the most recent work, Baillière (Paris), 1876. available at Gallica
