= Sedillot =

Sedillot is a surname. Notable people with the surname include:

- Charles-Emmanuel Sédillot (1804–1883), French military physician and surgeon
- René Sédillot (1906–1999), French journalist and historian
- Louis-Pierre-Eugène Sédillot (1808–1875), French orientalist and historian
