= Master Zacharius =

- Short story by Jules Verne
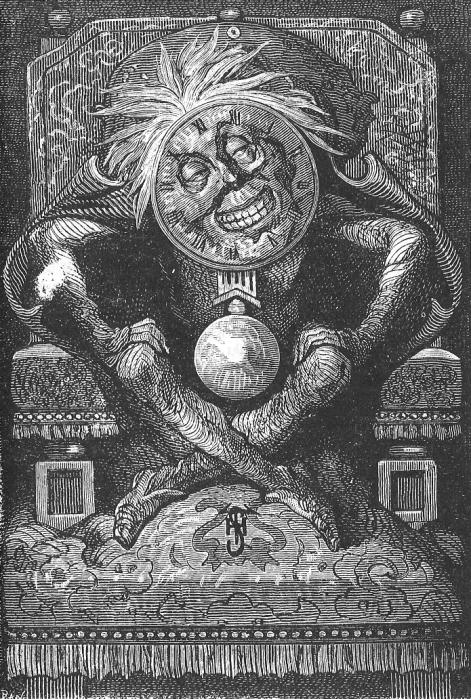
- Illustration by Théophile Schuler
- Original title: Maître Zacharius ou l’horloger qui avait perdu son âme
- Translator: George Makepeace Towle (1874); Abby L. Alger (1874)
- Country: France
- Language: French

Publication
- Published in: Musée des familles (1854); Doctor Ox (1874)
- Media type: Print
- Publication date: 1854, revised 1874
- Published in English: 1874

Master Zacharius, or the clockmaker who lost his soul (French: Maître Zacharius ou l'horloger qui avait perdu son âme, tradition genevoise) is an 1854 short story by Jules Verne. The story, an intensely Romantic fantasy echoing the works of E. T. A. Hoffmann, is a Faustian tragedy about an inventor whose overpowering pride leads to his downfall.

== Plot ==
On a small island in the middle of the Rhone within the town of Geneva, the clockmaker Master Zacharius lives with his daughter Gérande, his apprentice Aubert Thun, and his elderly servant Scholastique. Zacharius is celebrated throughout France and Germany for having invented the escapement, and is fiercely proud of his successes. When the story opens, he is troubled by an inexplicable mystery: for several days, all of the many clocks he has made and sold have begun to suddenly stop, one by one. Unable to fix any of them or to find a reason for the phenomenon, Zacharius falls into mental torment and becomes seriously ill.

Gérande and Aubert, who have gradually fallen in love with one another, manage to nurse Zacharius into better health, but are surprised by the appearance of a stranger in the town, a bizarre creature like a cross between a small old man and an anthropomorphic clock. The creature confronts Zacharius directly, taunting him about the failed clocks and suggesting that death is coming to him, but Zacharius rebukes him with "a flush of outraged pride": "I, Master Zacharius, cannot die, for, as I have regulated time, time would end with me! … No, I can no more die than the Creator of this universe, that submitted to His laws! I have become His equal, and I have partaken of His power! If God has created eternity, Master Zacharius has created time!" The creature offers to give Zacharius the secret of the clocks' failure in exchange for the hand of Gérande in marriage. Zacharius refuses, and the creature disappears.

Over the following days, Zacharius's illness and angered pride continue to increase, as more and more of his former clients bring their broken clocks back to him, demanding refunds. One morning he is found to have disappeared from the town. Gérande and Aubert, consulting his account book and recalling words he had spoken during his convalescence, realize that he has left in search of an iron clock sold to one Pittonaccio in a castle in Andernatt: it is the only clock of his that has not been returned to him, and thus the only clock apparently still working. Aubert, Gérande, and Scholastique leave immediately in pursuit, find Zacharius at last, and chase helplessly as he runs frantically to the castle. The clock, a masterpiece representing an old church and presenting a Christian maxim for every hour of the day, is still there, but the visitors also find themselves face to face with the clocklike creature, who introduces himself as Signor Pittonaccio.

The frantic Zacharius, believing his life to be wrapped up in the fate of the clock, agrees to let Pittonaccio wed Gérande against her will, thinking the marriage will grant him immortality. The clock strikes for each hour, but the old maxims have been replaced by statements of scientific hubris: "You must eat of the fruits of the tree of Science", "Man ought to become the equal of God", "Man should be the slave of Science, and sacrifice to it relatives and family." At the stroke of midnight, just as the marriage is about to be solemnized, the clock breaks down and a new maxim appears: "Who ever shall attempt to make himself the equal of God, shall be for ever damned!" The clock bursts and its spring breaks out and flies across the hall, with Zacharius, shouting that it is his soul, in pursuit. Pittonaccio seizes it and disappears into the ground, and Zacharius, having become a slave of hubris who believes "there is nothing but science in this world", dies immediately. Aubert and Gérande return to Geneva, where they live for many years, praying for the redemption of the lost soul of Master Zacharius.

== Publication ==
The story was first printed in April–May 1854 in the magazine Musée des familles. It was later reprinted by Pierre-Jules Hetzel in the collection Doctor Ox (1874), as part of the Voyages Extraordinaires series. Two English translations, "Master Zacharius" by George Makepeace Towle and "Master Zachary" by Abby L. Alger, were published in 1874 in different English versions of Doctor Ox.

== Adaptations ==
In 1961, "Master Zacharius" was loosely adapted as a one-hour television play, "The Terrible Clockman", for The Shirley Temple Show. The adaptation, starring Sam Jaffe as a benign Zacharius and Shirley Temple as Gérande, largely discarded Verne's plot and themes in favor of a Frankenstein-like narrative about an out-of-control automaton. In the same year, Alfred Hitchcock Presents aired an uncredited adaptation, "The Changing Heart", with Abraham Sofaer as the Zacharius character and Anne Helm and Nicholas Pryor as the equivalents of Gérande and Aubert, respectively; this version, directed by the Verne aficionado Robert Florey, altered the plot but preserved the Faustian overtones of the original.

Maître Zacharius, an opera composed and adapted by Jean-Marie Curti, was premiered by the Opéra-Studio de Genève in Bonneville, Paris, and Geneva in 2008.
