= Towle =

Towle may refer to:

- Towle (surname)
- Towle, California, a community in Placer County
- Towle Silversmiths, one of the most prestigious silver manufacturers in the United States
