= A Winter amid the Ice =

1855 short story by Jules Verne

- Short story by Jules Verne
- Illustration by Adrien Marie (1874)
- Original title: Un hivernage dans les glaces
- Translator: George Makepeace Towle; Abby L. Alger; Stephen William White
- Country: France
- Language: French
- Genre: Adventure story

Publication
- Published in: Musée des familles
- Publication type: Periodical
- Media type: Print (magazine and hardback)
- Publication date: 1855
- Published in English: 1874

"A Winter amid the Ice" (French: Un hivernage dans les glaces) is an 1855 short adventure story by Jules Verne.

The story was first printed in April–May 1855 in the magazine Musée des familles. It was later reprinted by Pierre-Jules Hetzel in the collection Doctor Ox (1874), as part of the Voyages Extraordinaires series. Three English translations ("A Winter amid the Ice" by George Makepeace Towle, "A Winter Among the Ice-Fields" by Abby L. Alger, and "A Winter's Sojourn in the Ice" by Stephen William White) were published in 1874.
