= Parretti =

Parretti is a surname. Notable people with the surname include:

- Giancarlo Parretti (born 1941), Italian financier
- Tony Parretti (1892–1927), American gangster

== See also ==
- Parrett (surname)
- Parrette
