= Doctor Ox =

1874 collection of short stories by Jules Verne

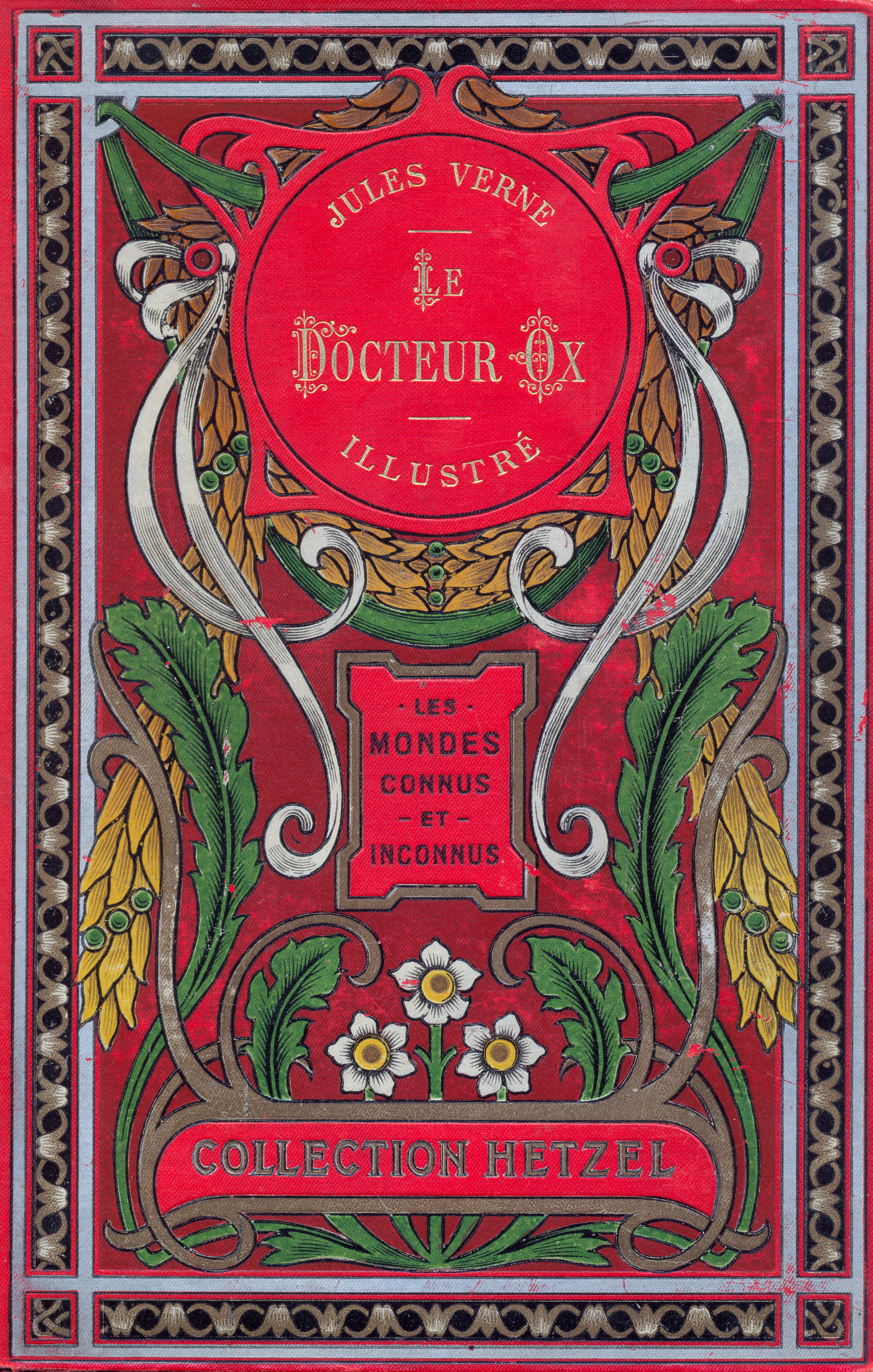
- Author: Jules Verne
- Original title: Le Docteur Ox
- Illustrator: Lorenz Froelich, Théophile Schuler, Émile-Antoine Bayard, Adrien Marie, Barbant, and Edmond Yon
- Language: French
- Series: Voyages Extraordinaires
- Genre: Short stories
- Publisher: Pierre-Jules Hetzel
- Publication date: 1874
- Publication place: France
- Media type: Print

Doctor Ox (French: Le Docteur Ox) is a collection of short stories by Jules Verne, first published in 1874 by Pierre-Jules Hetzel.

It consists of four varied works by Verne:

- "Une fantaisie du Docteur Ox" ("Dr. Ox's Experiment," 1872), illustrated by Lorenz Froelich
- "Maître Zacharius" ("Master Zacharius," 1854), illustrated by Théophile Schuler
- "Un drame dans les airs" ("A Drama in the Air," 1851), illustrated by Émile-Antoine Bayard
- "Un hivernage dans les glaces" ("A Winter Amid the Ice," 1855), illustrated by Adrien Marie and Barbant

The collection also includes a preface by Pierre-Jules Hetzel and a story, "Quarantième ascension au mont Blanc" ("Fortieth Ascent of Mont Blanc"), written by Verne's brother Paul and illustrated by Edmond Yon.
