= The Chariot of Death =

Painting by Théophile Schuler

- French: Le Char de la Mort, German: Der Todeskarren
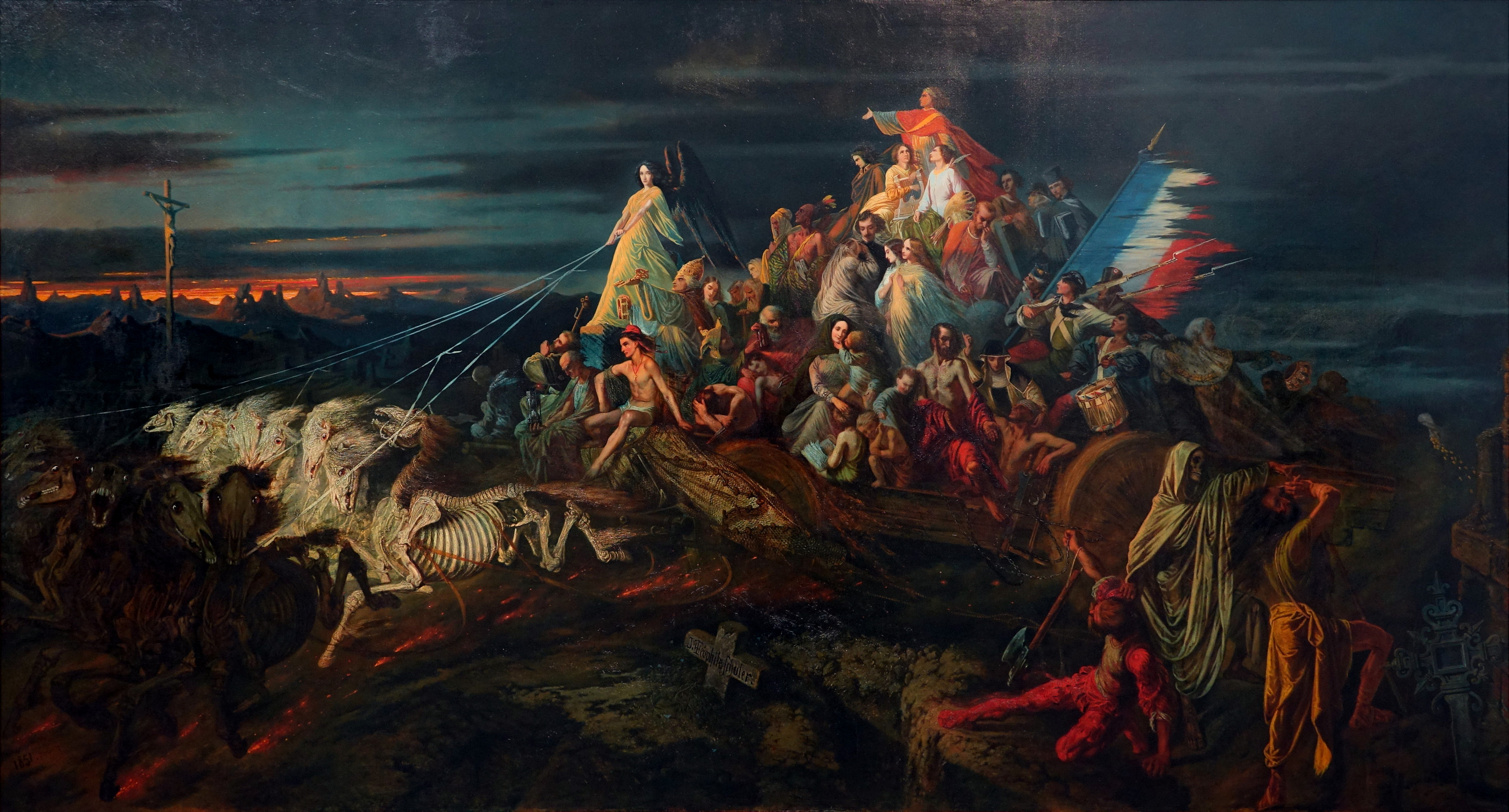
- Artist: Théophile Schuler
- Year: 1848–1851
- Medium: oil paint on canvas
- Movement: Romanticism
- Subject: Death
- Dimensions: 190 cm × 355 cm (75 in × 140 in)
- Location: Unterlinden Museum, Colmar
- Accession: 1862

The Chariot of Death is a large allegorical painting by Théophile Schuler. It was gifted to the Unterlinden Museum by the artist in 1862. Its inventory number is 88.RP.454. The painting is considered one of the most emblematic of the collection (which includes the world-famous Isenheim Altarpiece). A drawn copy of the painting is kept in the Cabinet des estampes et des dessins.

== Content ==
The painting was begun by Schuler (then 27 years old) after his return to his hometown of Strasbourg, under the impression of the Revolutions of 1848, specifically the French Revolution of 1848, which he had witnessed in Paris. Schuler worked on its completion until 1851, during which time he became witness to the counter-revolutionary backlash, which confirmed the pessimism and the anguish of his vision of the 1848 upheavals and turmoil.

The Chariot of Death is inspired by medieval and early Renaissance Dances of Death, especially Hans Holbein the Younger's. As with older depictions, Schuler's painting shows people from all ages and walks of life: a pope, a king, a young mother (modelled on the artist's sister), a fool, a poet, a sick man, a lawyer, a murderer, a Native American, an Arab, a young Napoleon... being taken away by death. A special emphasis is placed on artists (among them Dante and a self-portrait of Schuler), who are at the top of the pyramidal composition, and on French revolutionaries, with whom Schuler had empathized.

Schuler depicts different personifications of Death: one is the angel of death in the centre of the painting, a young and beautiful but cold-faced woman with black hair and black wings, who drives the chariot while looking straight at the viewer; the other is a skeleton in a shroud, in the lower right corner of the painting, which is shown grabbing an executioner with its right hand, while dramatically driving the Wandering Jew (a common trope of anti-Judaism) away with its left hand. On the opposite side of the diagonal starting bottom right with the Wandering Jew is a wayside cross, which the chariot is only driving by. Schuler thus raises the question of the meaning of death and alludes to answers brought upon by religion being unsatisfactory (varying from person to person).

== Gallery ==
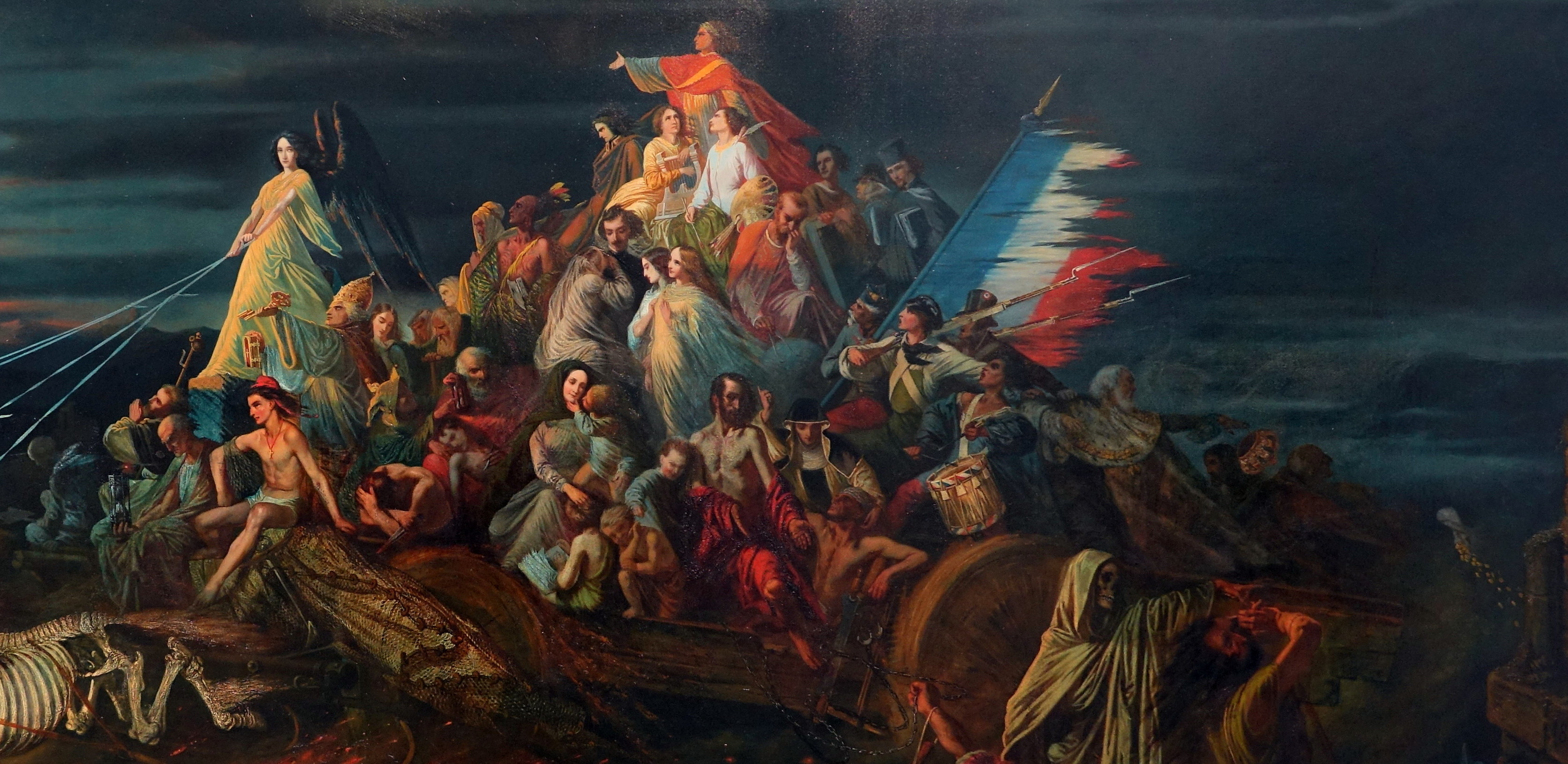
The angel of death with her passengers
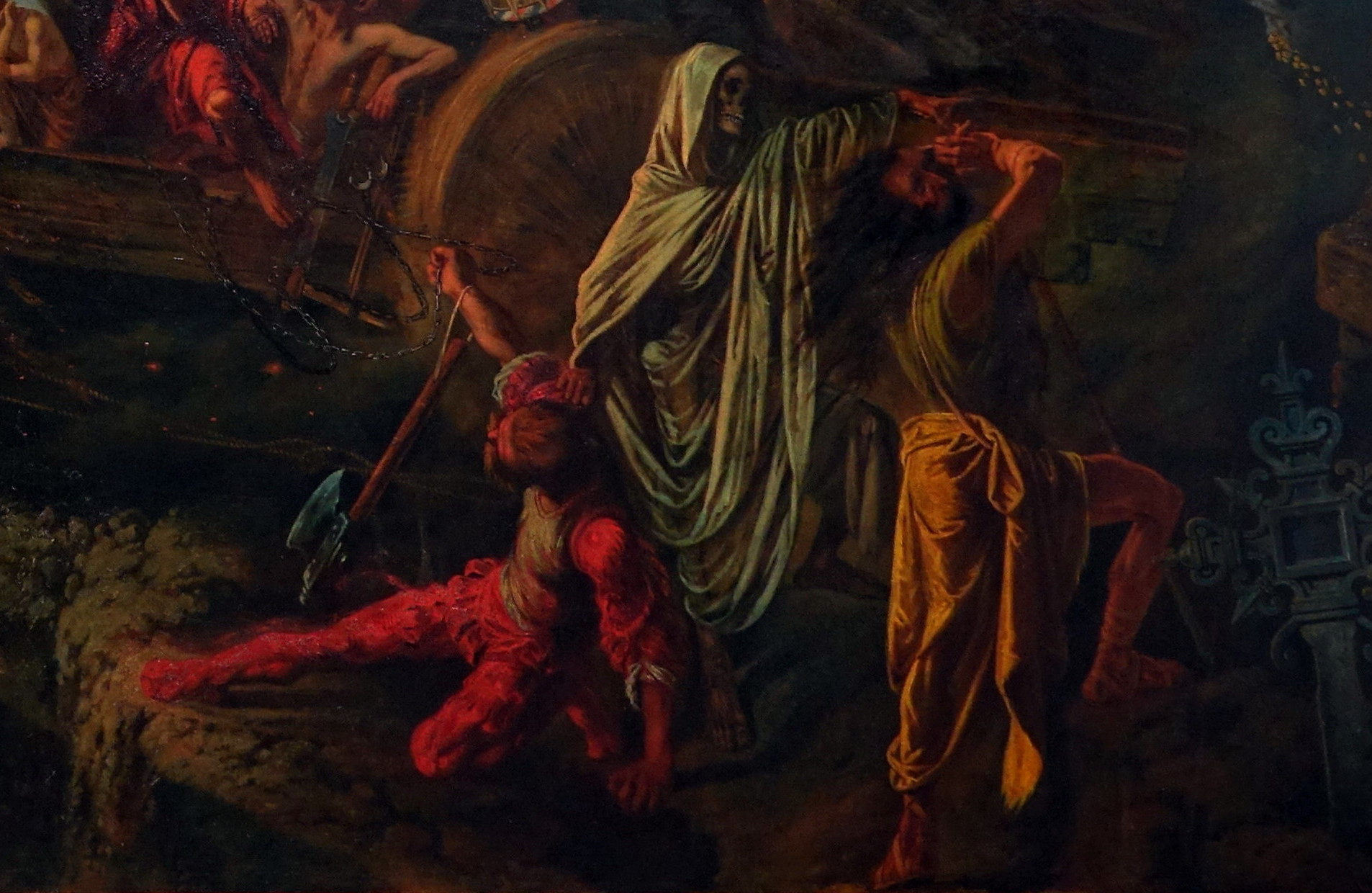
Death grabbing the executioner while sending the Wandering Jew away

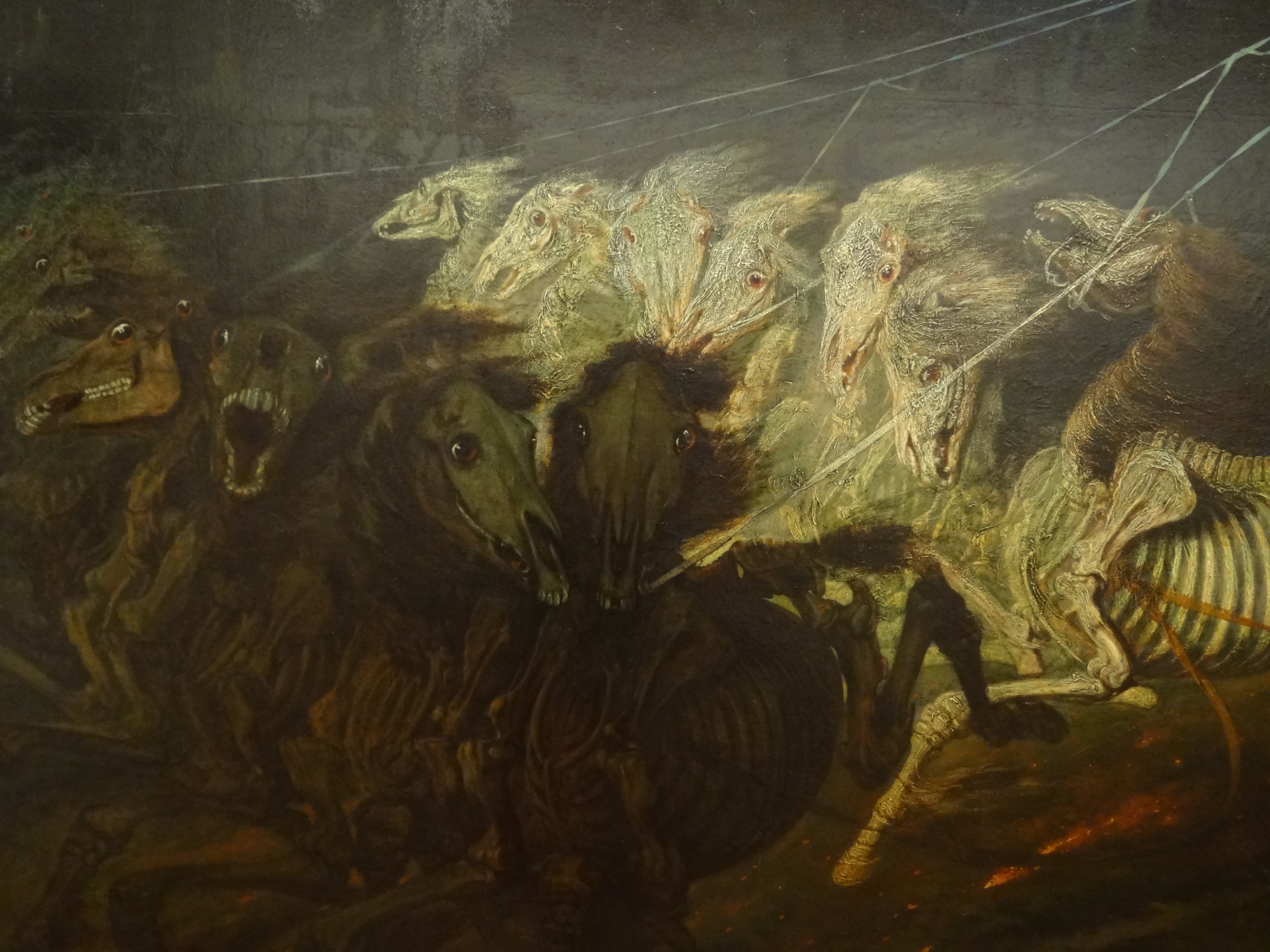
Death's horses

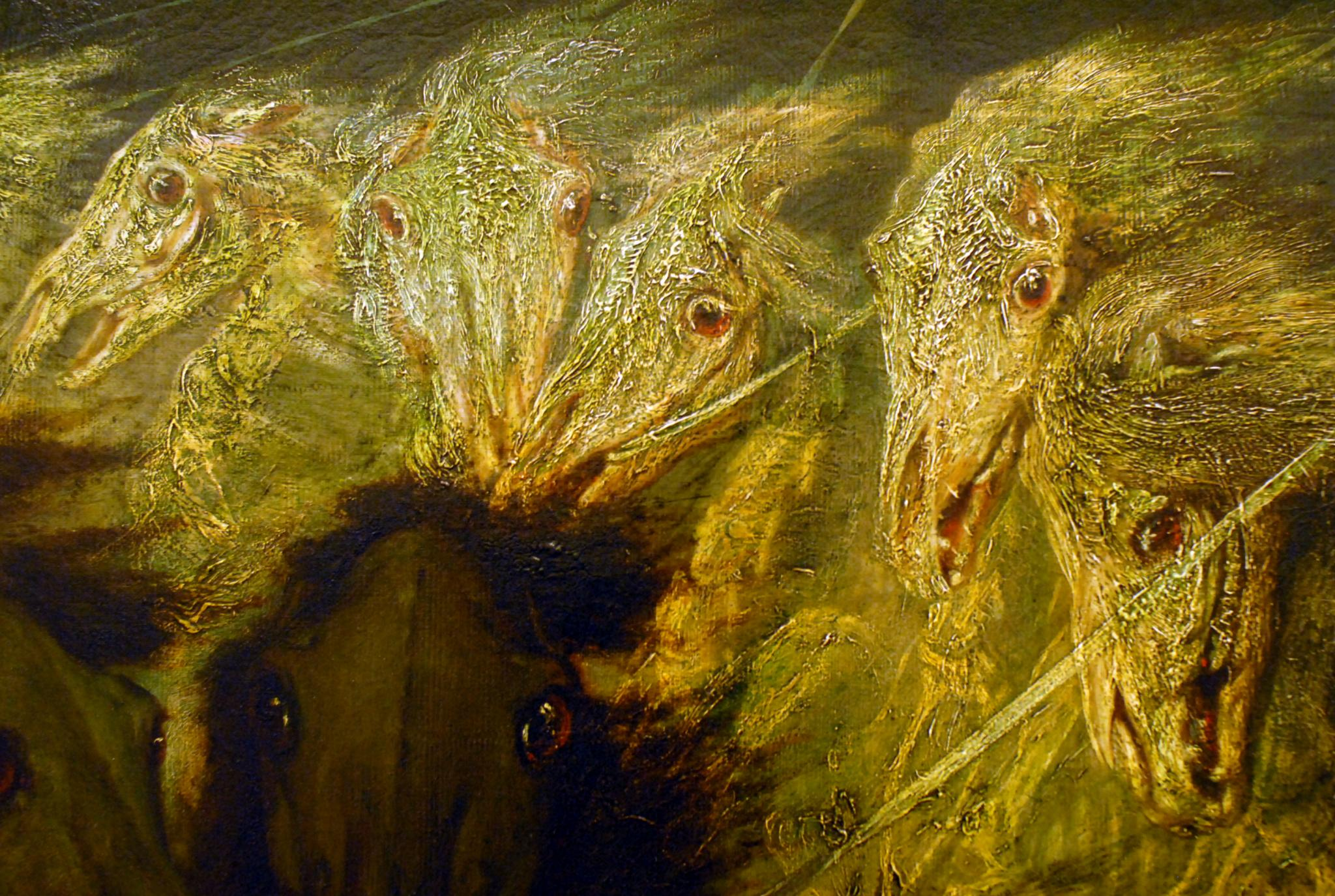
Closer view of Death's white horses, showing the intense brushwork

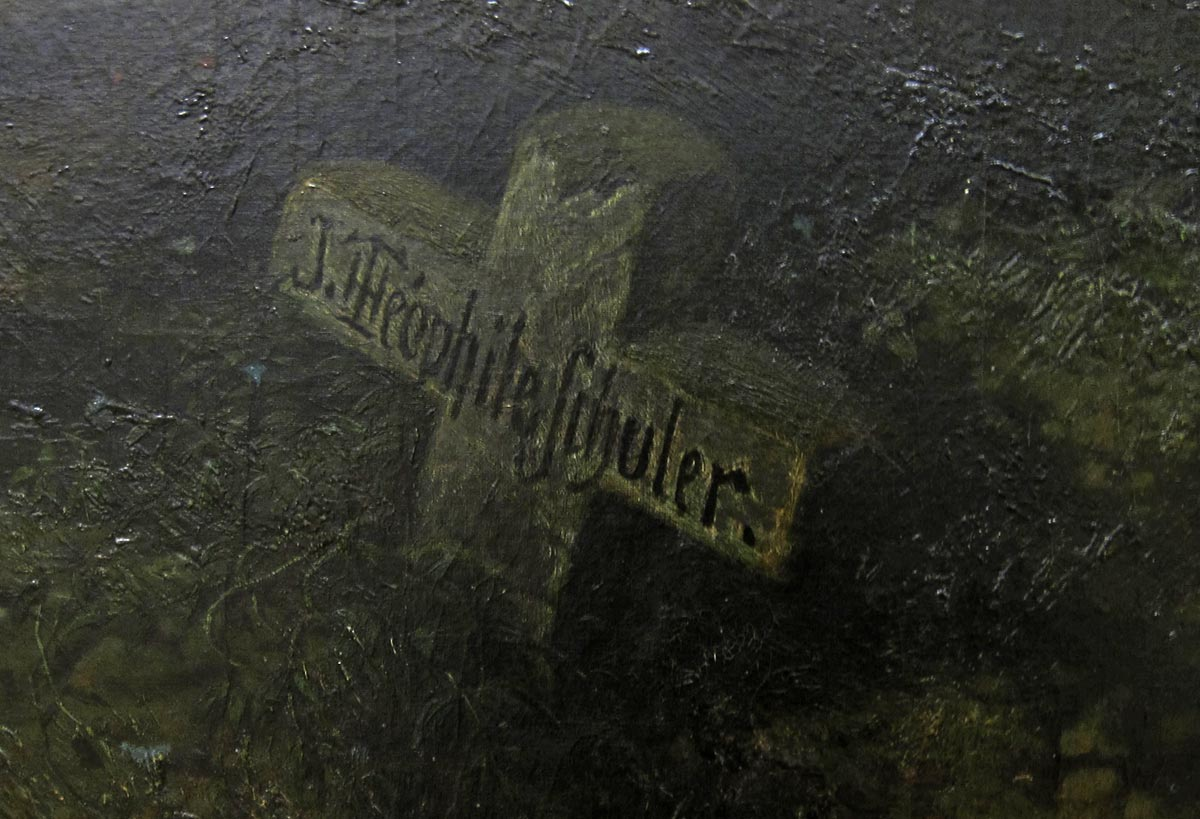
The painter's signature on a grave cross

== See also ==
- The Triumph of Death, painting by Pieter Bruegel the Elder

== Bibliography ==
- Emmanuel Honegger: Le Char de la mort, Le Verger Éditeur, Barr, June 2020, ISBN 978-2-84574-360-1
