= Stephen William White =

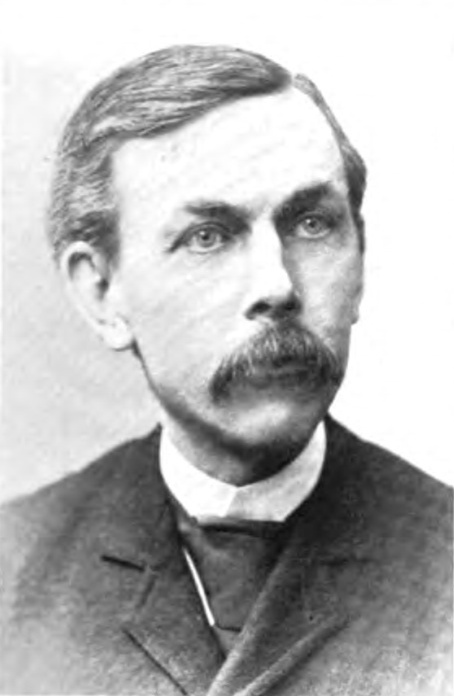
- Born: 16 July 1840; Philadelphia, Pennsylvania
- Died: October 1914 (aged 74)
- Education: Central High School, Philadelphia (31st Class), B.A. 1858, M.A. 1863
- Occupations: Secretary, Northern Central Railway and others
- Employer: Pennsylvania Railway System
- Known for: Translator of Jules Verne's novels
- Spouse: Ellen M. Leibert

Stephen William White (16 July 1840 – October 1914) was the secretary of the Northern Central Railway as well as a number of other Pennsylvanian railway companies until his retirement in 1910. Today, he is best known for his English translations of Jules Verne's novels in the Philadelphia Evening Telegraph.

== Biography ==
White was born in 1840 in Philadelphia, Pennsylvania, son of Emily and David W. White. In February 1854, he entered the Central High School of Philadelphia, Pennsylvania, and graduated there on 11 February 1858 with a Bachelor of Arts degree. From 1858 to 1870 White served as shorthand clerk to the treasurer of the American Sunday School Union, assistant editor of the Sunday School Times, and bookkeeper to several importing dry goods and grocery houses. In 1863 he earned a Master of Arts degree in the Central High School's 31st class. He married Ellen M. Leibert (1 July 1840 — 10 June 1897) on 21 September 1865.

On 1 February 1870 he began work as private secretary to Jay Cooke and held the job until 1873, when Jay Cooke & Company was bankrupted following the Panic of 1873. From 1872 through 1876 he worked as a freelance phonographer (shorthand secretary) and translator, producing English translations of five works by Jules Verne for serialization in the Philadelphia Evening Telegraph.

On 1 January 1875 he entered the service of the Pennsylvania Railroad as assistant secretary of the Northern Central Railway, and on 26 September 1877 he was promoted to secretary of the Northern Central Railway. In addition to his main duties there, he was also elected Secretary of the Shamokin Valley and Pottsville Railroad on 1 September 1880; Assistant Secretary of the Pennsylvania Company and of the Pittsburgh, Cincinnati and St. Louis Railway on 1 February 1881; clerk of the Girard Point Storage Company on 9 March 1881; Secretary of the Sodus Bay and Southern Railroad on 1 July 1884; Assistant Secretary of the Chicago, St. Louis and Pittsburgh Railroad on 23 September 1885; Secretary of the Elmira and Lake Ontario Railroad on 31 December 1886; Assistant Secretary of the Pittsburgh, Cincinnati, Chicago and St. Louis Railway on 18 September 1890; and Secretary of the Allegheny Valley Railway on 5 February 1892.

White retired on 1 August 1910 at the age of 70, and died in 1914.

== Translations ==
- Julius Hoffmann, Grandfather's Darling: A Tale (German: Großvaters Liebling: Eine Erzählung), Hoffman & Morwitz, 1872. OCLC 24674298.
- Jules Verne, A Fancy of Doctor Ox (French: Une fantaisie du docteur Ox), first published in the Philadelphia Evening Telegraph on 20 June 1874. Reprinted as a 124-page book (A Fancy of Doctor Ox; and, The Tour of the World in Eighty Days) later that year.
- Jules Verne, The Tour of the World in Eighty Days (French: Le tour du monde en quatre-vingts jours), first published in the Philadelphia Evening Telegraph from 27 June 1874 to 17 July 1874. Reprinted as a 124-page book (A Fancy of Doctor Ox; and, The Tour of the World in Eighty Days) later that year.
- Jules Verne, A Journey to the Centre of the Earth (French: Voyage au centre de la Terre), first published in the Philadelphia Evening Telegraph from 12 September 1874 to 5 October 1874. Reprinted as a book (A Journey to the Centre of the Earth; And, A Winter's Sojourn in the Ice) later that year.
- Jules Verne, A Winter’s Sojourn in the Ice (French: Un hivernage dans les glaces), first published in the Philadelphia Evening Telegraph from 6 October 1874 to 10 October 1874. Reprinted as a book (A Journey to the Centre of the Earth; And, A Winter's Sojourn in the Ice) later that year.
- Jules Verne, Mysterious Island (French: L'Île mystérieuse), first published in the Philadelphia Evening Telegraph in 1876. Reprinted as a 198-page book (The Mysterious Island; With a Map of the Island and a Full Glossary) later that year.
