= Eunice Makepeace Towle =

American portrait painter

- Born: May 4, 1806
- Died: October 19, 1894 (aged 88)
- Works: Martin Van Buren
- Children: George Makepeace Towle

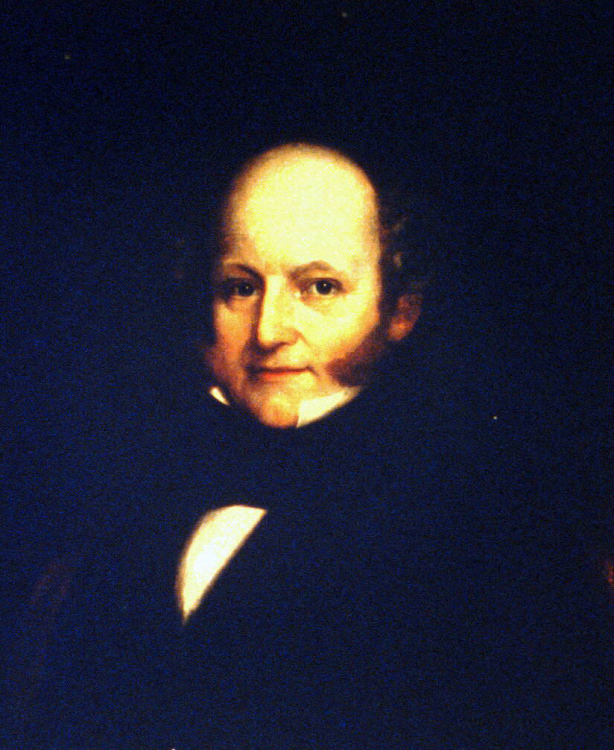
Eunice Makepeace Towle's portrait of President Martin Van Buren, in the Smithsonian National Portrait Gallery

Eunice Makepeace Towle (May 4, 1806 – October 19, 1894) was an American portrait painter. Her subjects included US Presidents John Quincy Adams, James K. Polk, and Martin Van Buren.

Eunice Makepeace was born on May 4, 1806, in Norton, Massachusetts, the daughter of Lysander and Sarah Makepeace. She married Dr. Nathaniel C. Towle in 1831. Their children included George Makepeace Towle, lawyer, author, and translator of Jules Verne.

Dr. Towle encouraged John Quincy Adams to sit for a portrait by her. Adams could be quite caustic in his diary about artists, and he wrote about Towle "Her portrait of me painted in October 1837 is hideous....the word applicable to all her works is not paint, but daub." Adams also loaned Towle Gilbert Stuart's portrait of his father John Adams, which she copied. The location of her portrait of John Quincy Adams is unknown.

Eunice Makepeace Towle died on October 19, 1894, in Andover, Massachusetts.
