= Louis-Pierre-Eugène Sédillot =

Louis-Pierre-Eugène Amélie Sédillot (23 June 1808 in Paris – 2 December 1875), was a French orientalist and historian of science and mathematics.

== Biography ==
His father, Jean Jacques Emmanuel Sédillot, orientalist and astronomer, worked alongside Delambre and Laplace. His older brother, Charles-Emmanuel Sédillot, became a renowned surgeon. Louis-Pierre-Eugene also showed predispositions towards study. He began his career as a history teacher before becoming Secretary of the Collège de France and the School of Oriental Languages in 1832.

== Selected works ==
- Manuel de la Bourse, contenant des notions exactes sur les effets publics français et étrangers, avec l'état de leur cours respectif depuis l'origine; sur les affaires qui se traitent à la Bourse de Paris, 1829
- Traité des instruments astronomiques des Arabes composé au treizième siècle par Aboul Hhassan Ali, de Maroc, intitulé Collection des commencements et des fins, traduit de l'arabe sur le manuscrit 1147 de la Bibliothèque royale par J.-J. Sédillot, et publié par L.-Am. Sédillot, 2 volumes, 1834–1835
- Manuel classique de chronologie, 2 volumes, 1834–1850
- Mémoire sur les instruments astronomiques des Arabes, 1841
- Mémoire sur les systèmes géographiques des Grecs et des Arabes, 1842
- Supplément au Traité des instruments astronomiques des Arabes, 1844
- Matériaux pour servir à l'histoire comparée des sciences mathématiques chez les Grecs et les Orientaux, 2 volumes, 1845–1849
- Prolégomènes des tables astronomiques d'Oloug-Beg, publiés avec notes et variantes et précédés d'une introduction, 1847
- Histoire des Arabes, 1854; 1877. Reprint: Plan-de-la-Tour : Éd. d'Aujourd'hui, coll. « Les Introuvables », 1984
- Mémoire sur l'origine de nos chiffres, 1865
- Les Professeurs de mathématiques et de physique générale au Collège de France, 1869. Reprint: Ann Arbor : UMI, 1992
