= Charles Boersch =

Charles Boersch was prefect of Strasbourg in 1870 during the Siege of Strasbourg in the Franco-Prussian War. Boersch was a member of the Assemblée nationale from 8 February 1871 to 1 March 1871.
