= Paul R. Parrette =

Paul R. Parrette (January 28, 1906, Utah - October 17, 1980) was a former general manager of the Philippine Manufacturing Company in the Philippines. He was also one of the original board of trustees of the Philippine Rural Reconstruction Movement. He was married to Frances E. Parrette (born on August 17, 1907 - died on September 13, 1963).

== See also ==
- History of the Philippines (1898–1946)
- Commonwealth (U.S. insular area)
- Thomasites
