= Mary Rutter Towle =

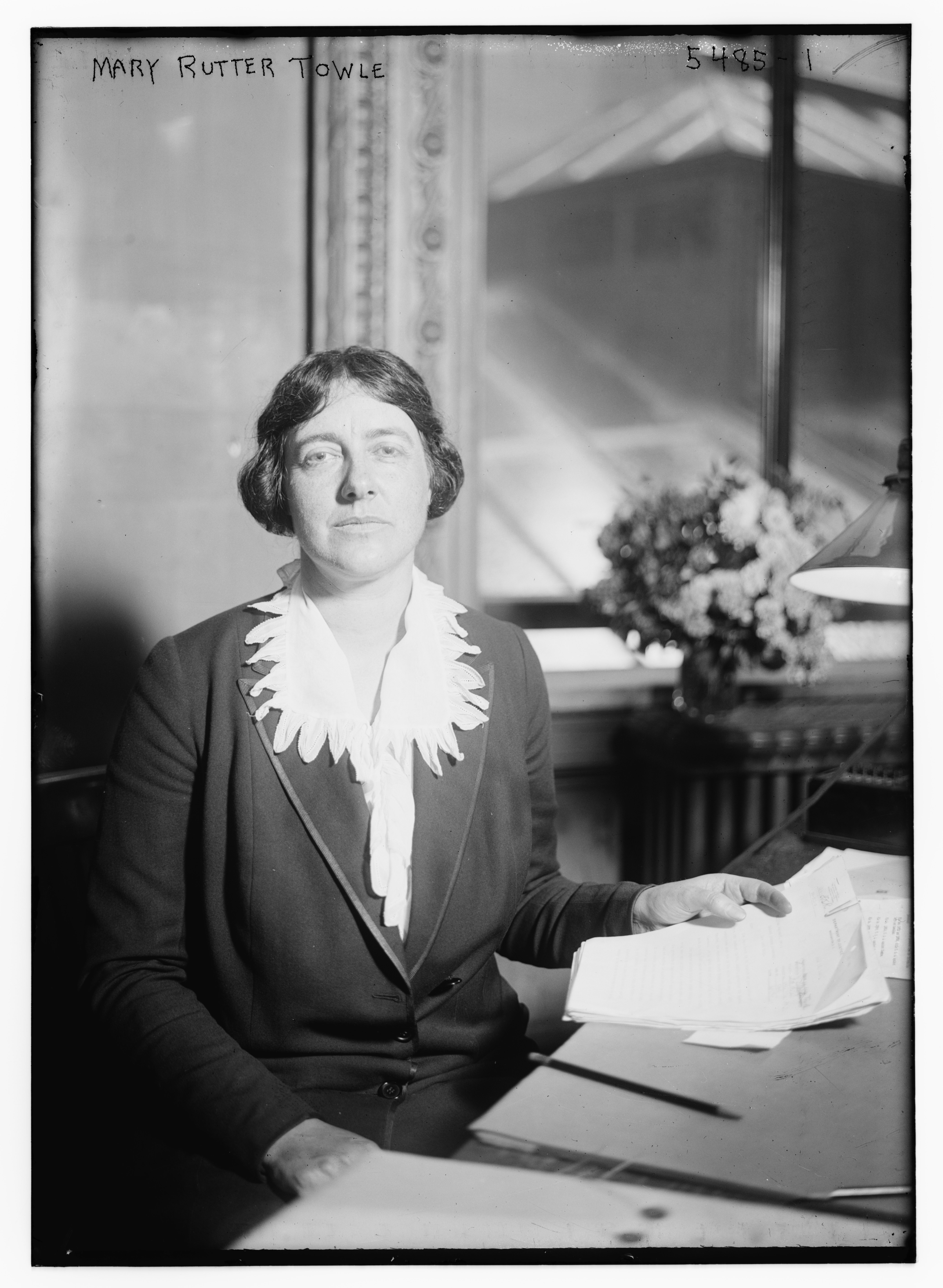
Towle in 1921

Mary Rutter Towle (1876–1953) was the general counsel for the National American Woman Suffrage Association and one of the first women to become Assistant United States Attorney (AUSA). As AUSA, she served for the Southern District of New York. She was an advocate for women's suffrage in the United States.

== Life and career ==
Towle came from Massachusetts. She graduated from Bryn Mawr College, from where she became friends with Katharine Martha Houghton Hepburn, the mother of Katharine Hepburn. She then got two master's degrees from Radcliffe in physics and chemistry, studied music in France, and taught at a high school in New England for some years. She went to law school at New York University in 1908, despite it being very rare for a woman to go to law school at this time. Upon graduation, she worked for Retha Rembaugh; Lisa Zornberg, a present-day lawyer, argues that the two may have been gay. In 1912, she joined a night parade for women's suffrage along with thousands of other protestors.

Towle was the general counsel for the National American Woman Suffrage Association from 1913 to 1919. During this time, the organization supported World War I and president Woodrow Wilson, and had two million members. She was described by the New York Times as "an enthusiastic suffragist". She also served at the Woman Suffrage Party for two years before the suffrage amendment passed, as well as the National Association of Women Lawyers. In 1921, she was appointed as Assistant United States Attorney by William Hayward, then United States attorney. She was the first woman to reach this position in a federal district east from Mississippi, as well as the only woman to occupy that position at the time. She was a Republican and was described by Zornberg as "highly qualified" for the job. Towle did not think that being AUSA as a woman was something that should bring forth curiosity.

Three days after she became an AUSA, Congress proposed a bill prohibiting women from smoking in public. Commenting on this, she said "The important question is whether any sex legislation is possible now that women are equal citizens". During her service, she sued ship companies for discharging oil in New York Harbor, defended immigration appeals, and enforced the Food and drugs act. She served until she was 70.
