= Parrett (surname) =

Parrett is an English surname. Notable persons with the name include:

- Aaron Parrett (born 1967), American professor, author, musician, and letterpress printer
- Dean Parrett (born 1991), English footballer
- Dennis Parrett (born 1959), American politician
- Favel Parrett (born 1974), Australian writer
- Jeff Parrett (born 1961), American baseball pitcher
- William F. Parrett (1825–1895), U.S. Representative from Indiana
- William G. Parrett (born 1945), American CPA, management in finance
