= Assistant United States Attorney =

Local US government attorney/prosecutor

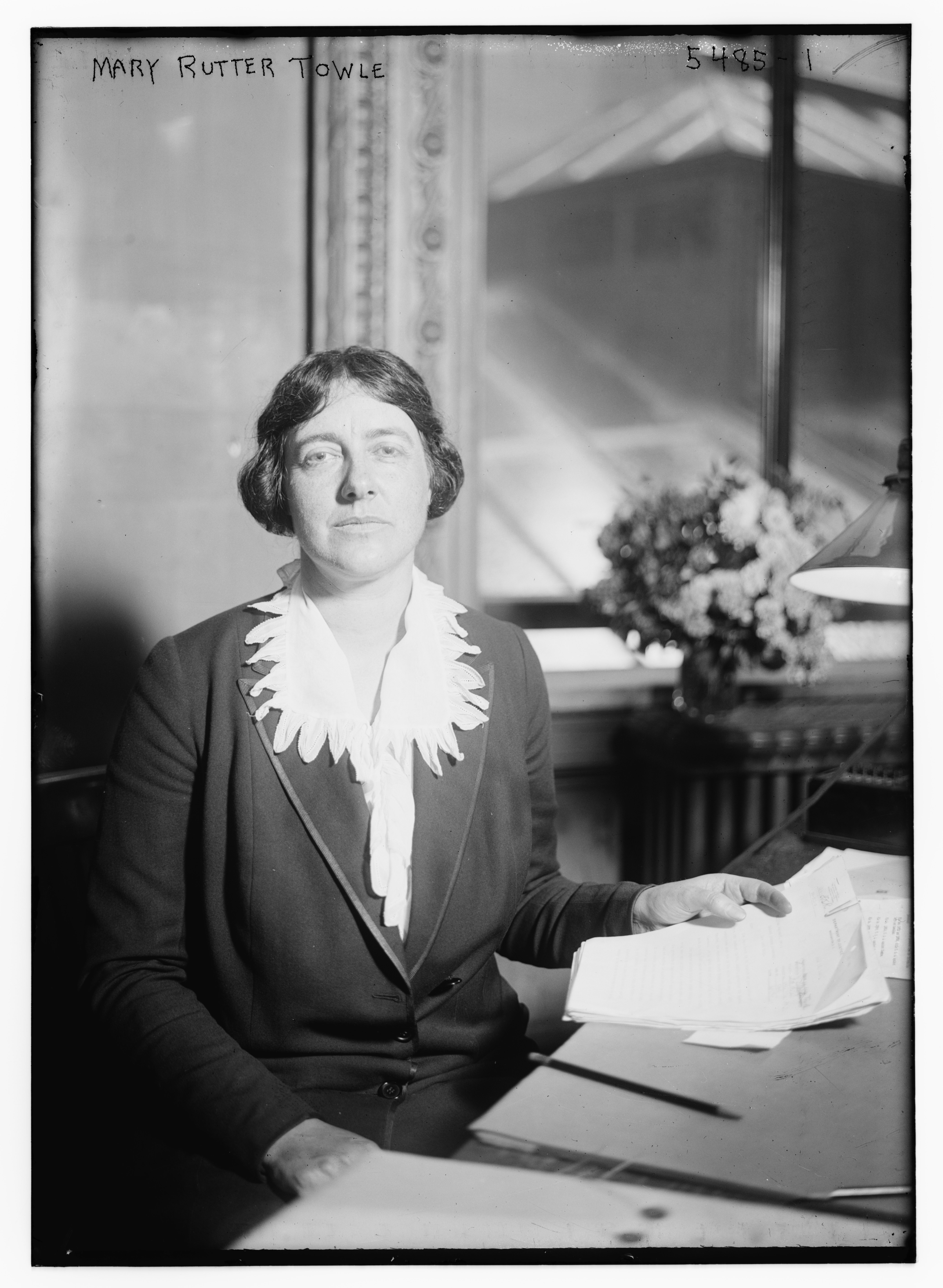
Mary Rutter Towle, c. 1921, one of the first women to become an assistant U.S. attorney

An assistant United States attorney (AUSA) is a career civil servant lawyer in the United States Department of Justice who serves under the United States Attorney for a federal judicial district. AUSAs represent the U.S. federal government in civil and appellate litigation and in federal criminal prosecutions. Those assigned to the criminal section of a U.S. Attorney's Office are commonly known as federal prosecutors.

AUSAs are rarely hired directly out of law school and often have significant experience before entering the U.S. Attorney’s Office.

== Personnel and duties ==
AUSAs are career civil servants. In 2008, the U.S. Department of Justice employed approximately 5,800 AUSAs. As of 2022, there were approximately 6,300 AUSAs. The various U.S. Attorney's Offices vary significantly in size and in number of AUSAs employed. For example, approximately 280 AUSAs work at the U.S. Attorney's Office for the Central District of California, which covers the Los Angeles area (the largest DOJ office outside Washington). By contrast, approximately 62 AUSAs work at the U.S. Attorney's Office for South Carolina.

Some AUSAs are criminal prosecutors, while others represent the U.S. government in civil litigation.

Many AUSAs, after spending some time working for the Justice Department, return to the private practice of law. Other AUSAs work in the role until retirement. As of 2020, the longest-serving AUSA nationwide had worked for 50 years in Little Rock. The oldest-serving AUSA, who worked at the U.S. Attorney's Office in Newark, died in 2019 at age 89; she had chosen to continue working long after others decided to retire.

The National Association of Assistant U.S. Attorneys (NAAUSA) is the professional association for AUSAs. NAAUSA represents the interests of AUSAs, pressing DOJ and Congress for higher pay for AUSAs (whose salaries are low compared to private lawyers) and more telework opportunities. NAAUSA has also targeted the pay disparity between AUSAs and trial attorneys at Main Justice; the latter tend to be paid more than the former.

As of 2020, AUSAs earned a starting base salary of $55,204, which may be significantly adjusted for their local cost of living and increases with years of experience up to a maximum of $176,200.

== Special Assistant United States Attorney ==
Federal law authorizes the attorney general to appoint special assistant U.S. attorneys, known as SAUSAs, "to assist United States attorneys when the public interest so requires." The "SAUSA" designation is sometimes granted to state prosecutors (such as assistant state attorneys general) working alongside federal prosecutors on various investigations and prosecutions. In addition to designating non-federal employees, the SAUSA designation is also given to federal lawyers employed by non-DOJ agencies, such as the Social Security Administration, U.S. Postal Service, or Federal Bureau of Investigation, who work alongside AUSAs because of their expertise. They are paid by that agency and seconded to a United States Attorney's Office for a set period of time. This designation may also be given to an AUSA who is seconded to a different district or from Main Justice to a specific office. Appointing local prosecutors or enforcement attorneys to assist in a joint investigation and prosecution has been criticized for having the potential for conflicts of interest, selective and vindictive prosecution, as well as dual and successive prosecution.

Uncompensated SAUSAs can also be unpaid volunteers; they have the same duties as AUSAs, but receive no salary. These roles are typically held by young lawyers seeking to establish "professional credibility".
