= Théophile Schuler =

French painter (1821–1878)

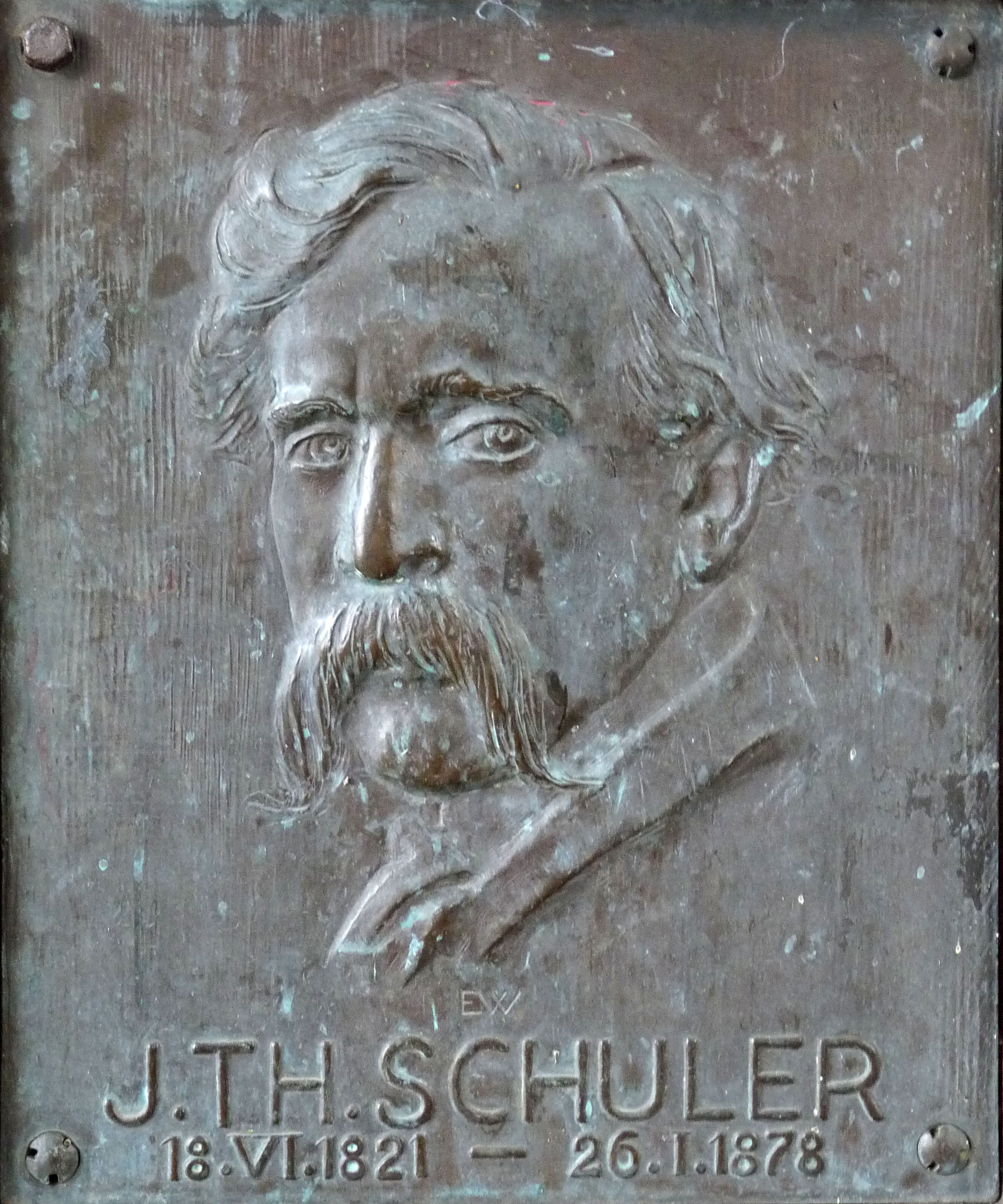
- Portrait of Schuler with his dates of birth and death
- Born: Jules Théophile Schuler; 18 June 1821; Strasbourg, Kingdom of France
- Died: 26 January 1878 (aged 56); Strasbourg, Alsace-Lorraine
- Resting place: Strasbourg, France
- Known for: paintings and drawings
- Notable work: The Chariot of Death (1848–1851)
- Style: Romanticism

Jules Théophile Schuler (18 June 1821 – 26 January 1878) was a French painter and illustrator in the Romantic style. His name was given to an art award established in 1938.

== Life ==
The son of a pastor, he studied painting in his hometown, intaglio printmaking in Karlsruhe and finally took further lessons in the studios of Michel Martin Drolling and Paul Delaroche in Paris between 1839 and 1843. After 1848, he settled in Strasbourg where he painted, illustrated and gave drawing courses. From 1859 onwards, he collaborated with the publisher Pierre-Jules Hetzel, for whom he illustrated works by Verne (Master Zacharius), Hugo (Les Châtiments) and Erckmann-Chatrian, but also an alphabet for children, to which a letter "W" was added when it appeared in an American edition as Letters Everywhere: Stories And Rhymes For Children, and the children's classic Hans Brinker, or The Silver Skates.

Schuler's masterpiece is the monumental oil on canvas painting The Chariot of Death, created in a spirit of mystical despair after the French Revolution of 1848 and similar simultaneous events in Europe. It is prominently displayed in the Unterlinden Museum of Colmar, to which it was given by the artist in 1862.

In his mature years in Strasbourg, Schuler lived in a Renaissance house on 1, quai Saint-Nicolas. He is commemorated by a relief portrait below the oriel window. Since 1918, a street in Strasbourg bears his name (rue Théophile Schuler).

== Prize ==
The Prix Théophile Schuler is awarded every year to up and coming local artists under the age of 35 by the Société des Amis des Arts et des Musées de Strasbourg ("Society of the friends of the arts and of the museums of Strasbourg"), founded in 1832, of which Schuler was a general secretary. It was established in 1938 thanks to a legacy by Schuler's daughter Alsa; in 2016, the prize amount was 3,000 Euros.

== Gallery ==
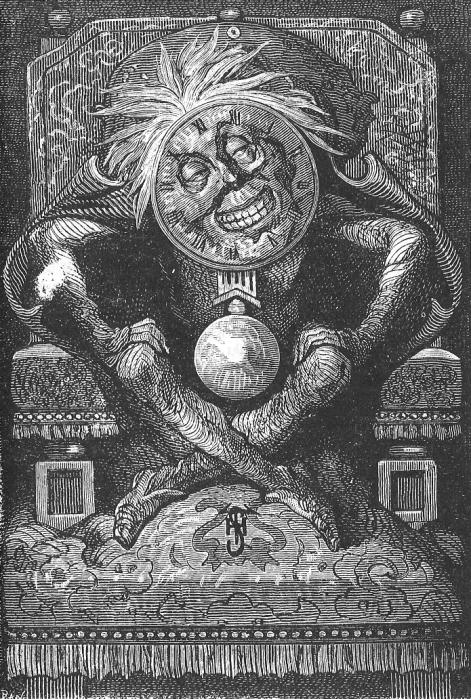
The Time Demon. Illustration from Jules Verne's Master Zacharius

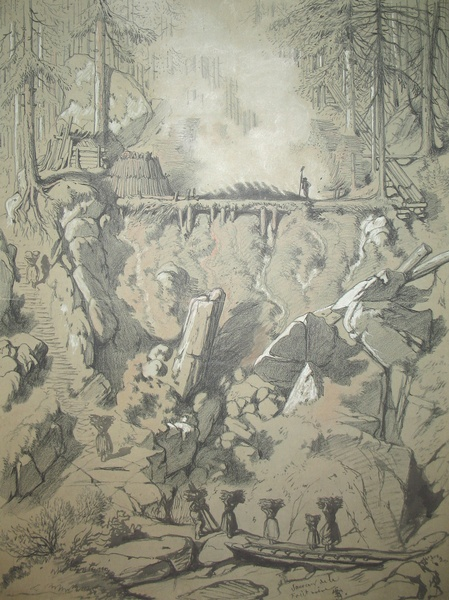
Recalling the Black Forest (Cabinet des estampes et des dessins, Strasbourg)

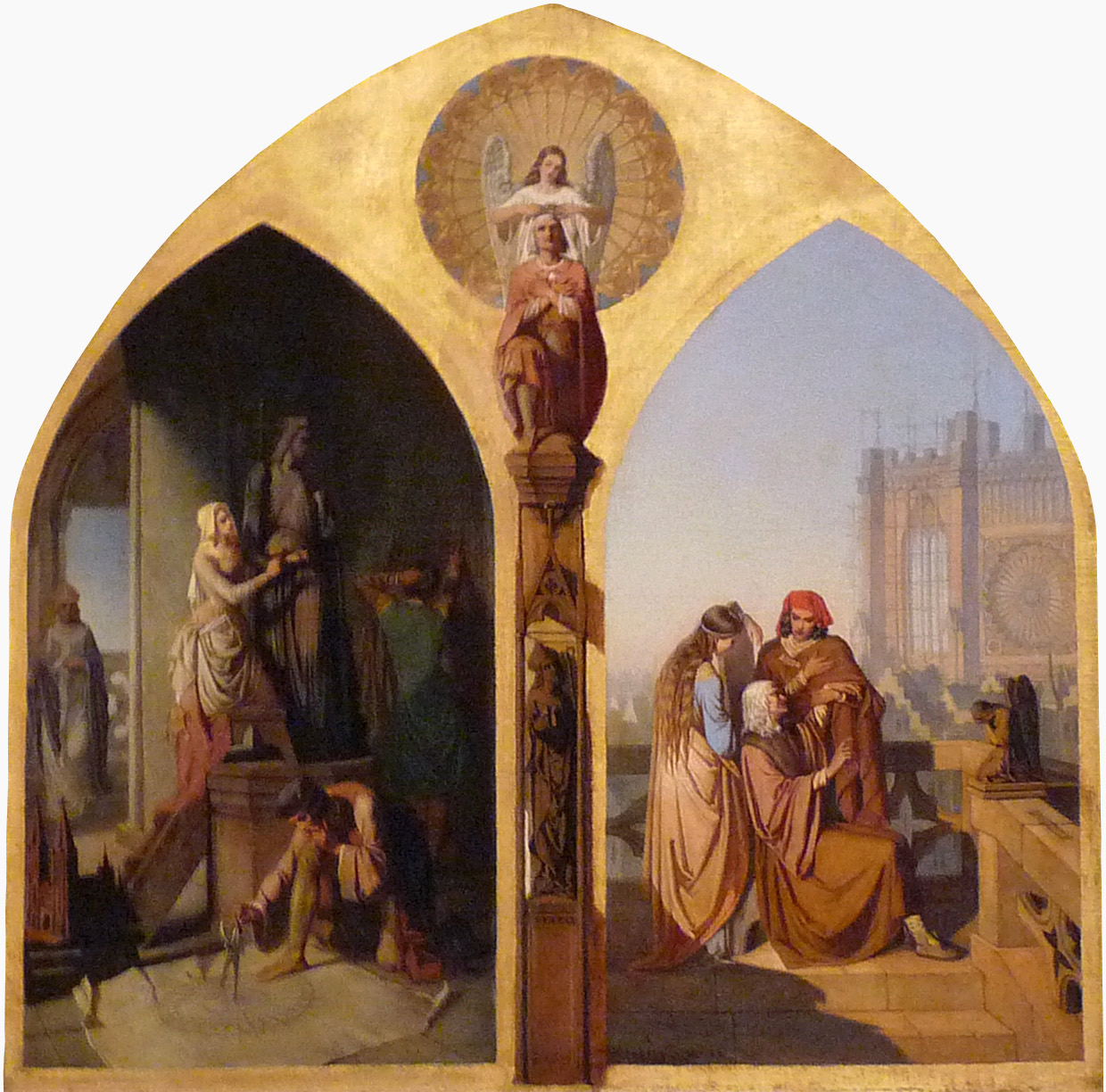
Erwin von Steinbach (1846, Musée des Beaux-Arts de Strasbourg)

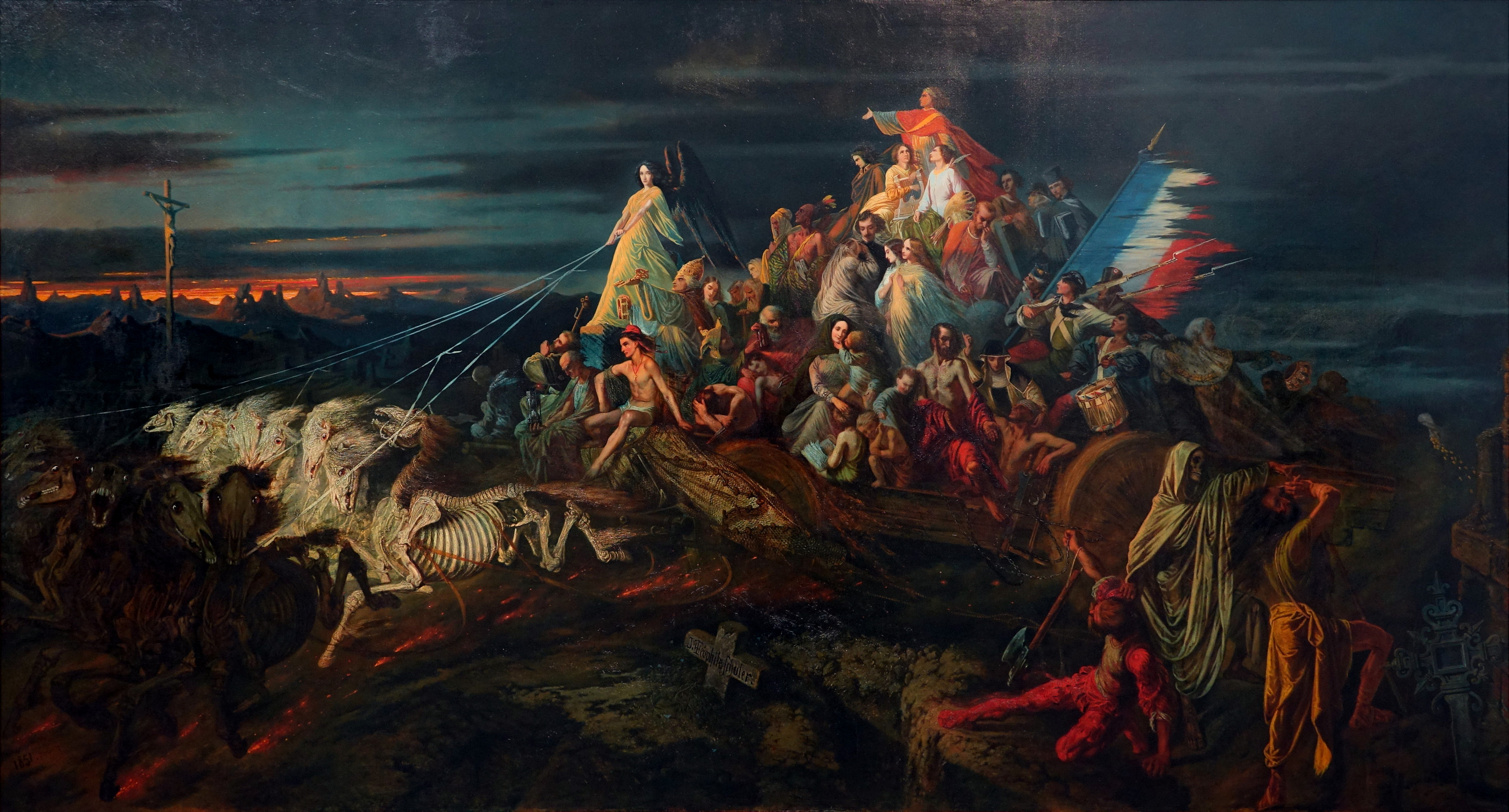
The Chariot of Death (1848–1851, Unterlinden Museum, Colmar)

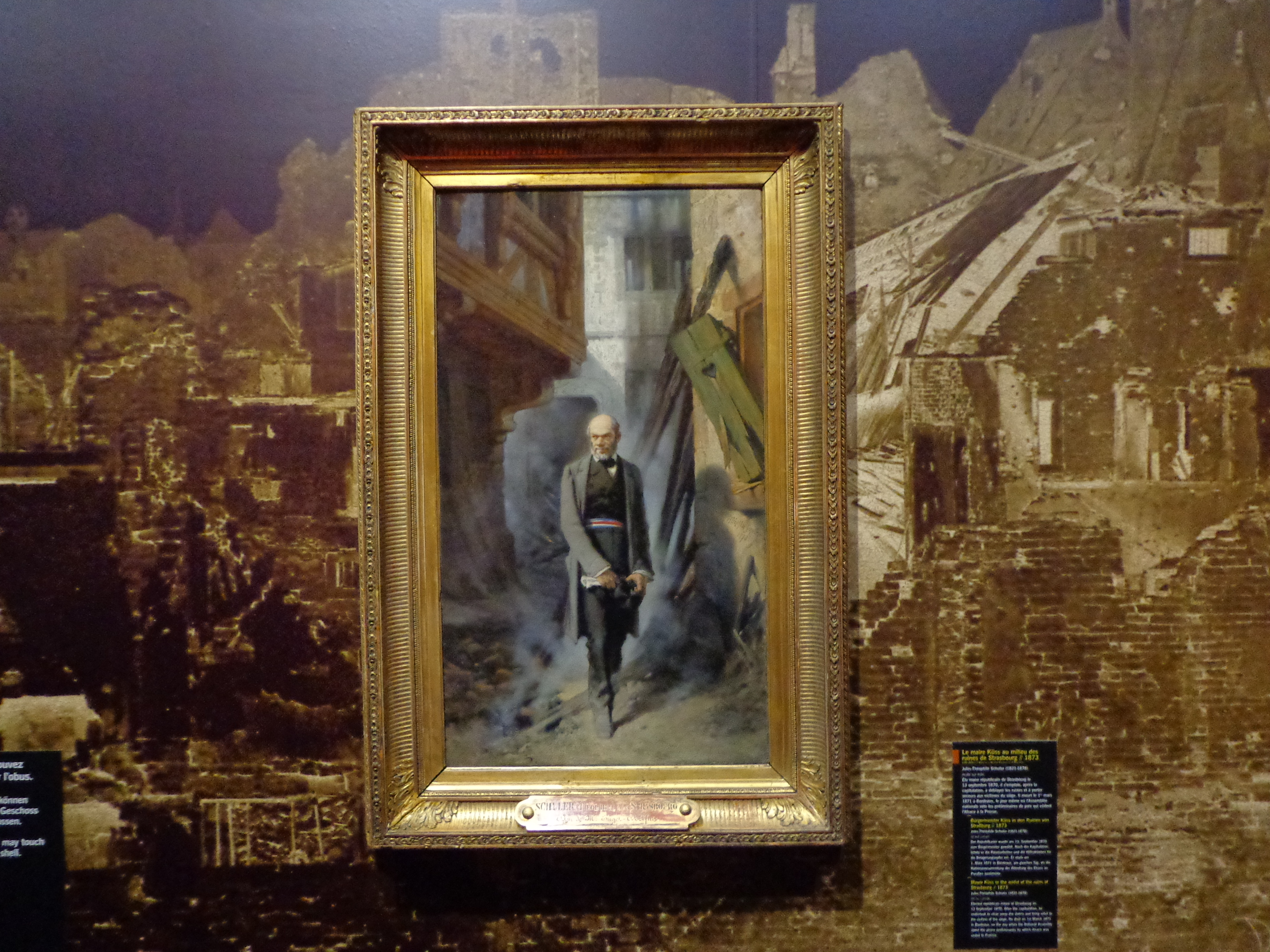
Mayor Küss in the ruins of Strasbourg (1873, Musée historique de Strasbourg)

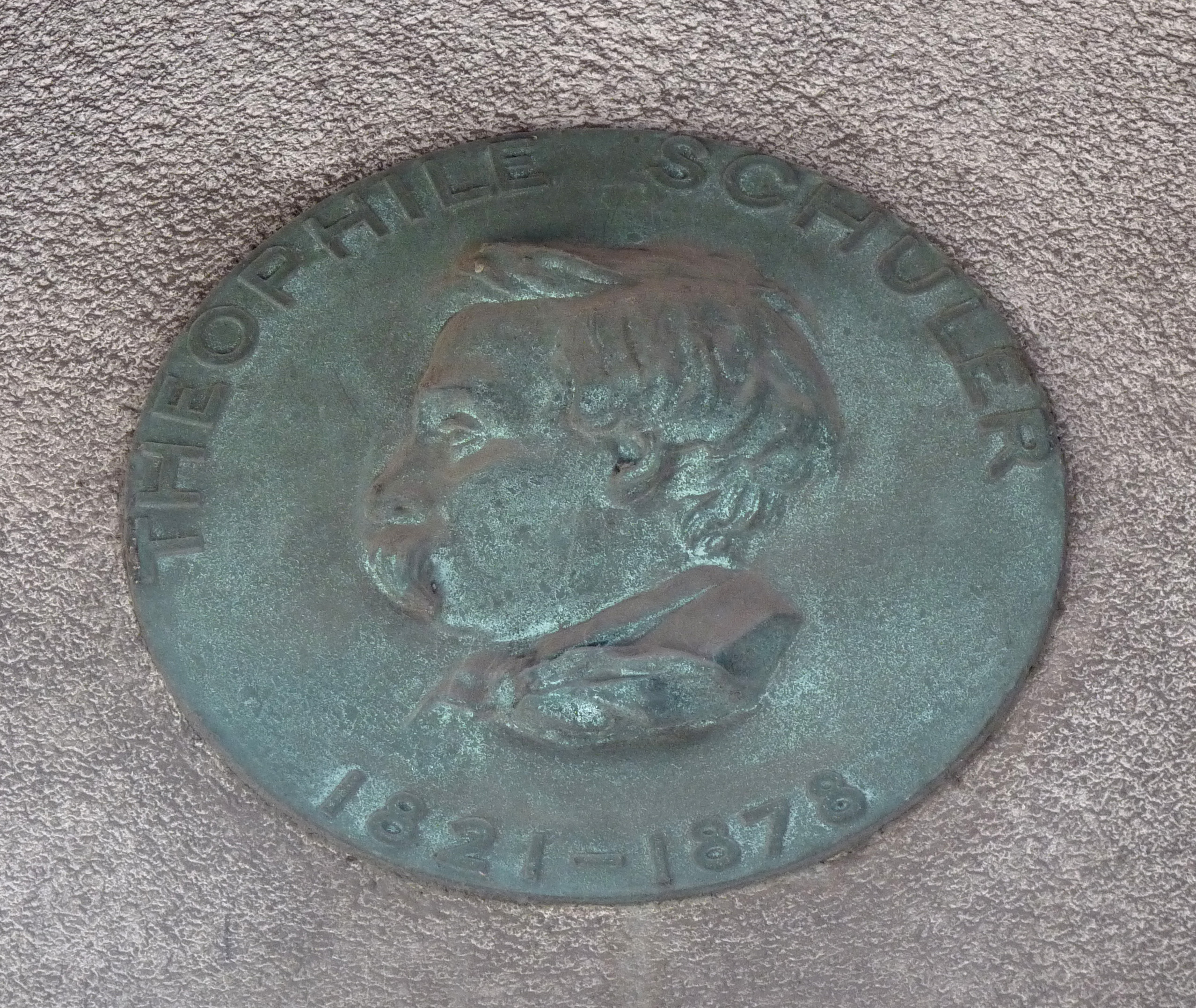
Schuler by Bartholdi

== See also ==
- List of European art awards
