= Adolph Hannover =

Danish doctor

Adolph Hannover (24 November 1814 - 7 July 1894) was a Danish pathologist who in 1843 carried out the first definitive microscopic description of a cancer cell. Hannover is said to have introduced the microscope to Denmark, but his work had widespread influence; his book Om Mikroskopets Bygning og dets Brug (1847) was translated into English and several other languages. He also may be seen as one of the earliest epidemiologists, who utilized population density in different blocks and streets of Copenhagen to explain corresponding rates of hospital admissions, and even to recommend demolition of buildings.
