= John Banovich =

American artist

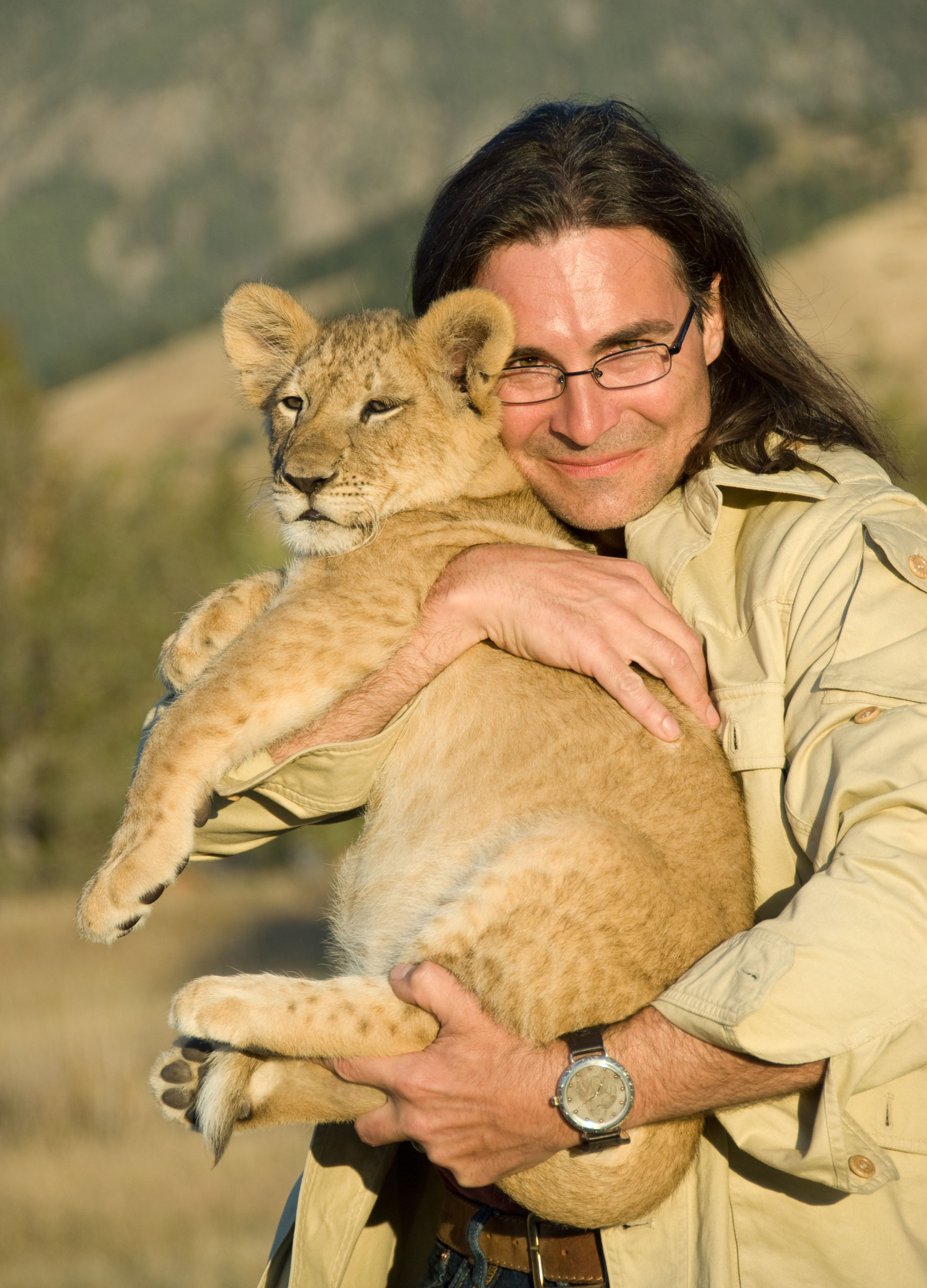
- John Banovich with Lion Cub
- Born: 1964 (age 61–62); Lewistown, Montana
- Education: University of Montana; The Art Institute of Seattle
- Known for: Wildlife Art, Conservation, Painting
- Notable work: Maneaters of Tsavo, Once Upon A Time, BEAST: The Collected Works of John Banovich
- Patrons: Richard Childress, Paul Tudor Jones

John Banovich (born 1964) is an American oil painter. He is known for his large paintings of wildlife. Banovich's work has appeared in many venues, including the Leigh Yawkey Woodson Art Museum’s Birds in Art show, the Hiram Blauvelt Art Museum, and the Salmagundi Club.

== Early life ==
John Banovich was born in Lewistown, Montana. His interest in art and animals originated at a young age, inspired by The Jungle Book and Grizzly Adams, and encouraged by his father's passion for wildlife and the outdoors. By the sixth grade, Banovich had sold two paintings.

After high school Banovich enrolled at the University of Montana in Missoula to double major in art and zoology. Banovich transferred to the Art Institute of Seattle for a degree in visual communications.

== Work ==
Banovich is known for his large canvases. It was in the late 1990s when his passion for large-scale paintings took hold.

One of Banovich's most well known works, "Man Eaters of Tsavo" (2002, 50 x 80 in., Oil on Belgian Linen) was one of the first works to come out of the new Montana studio. The painting tells the powerful story of two lions who murdered and devoured more than 135 people in 1898, during the construction of the British railway. Colonel Patterson pursued them for nine months before finally putting them to rest. The limited edition print run sold out immediately and the Foundation Edition has helped raise significant funds for conservation efforts.

In 2003, he founded the Banovich Wildscapes Foundation (BWF), a nonprofit organization fostering cooperative efforts to conserve the earth's wild places benefiting the wildlife and the people that live there.

== Exhibitions ==
The "Nature of the Beast" exhibition, composed solely of Banovich works, was displayed in 2010 at both the Wildlife Experience Museum and Museum of the Southwest.

In 2019 through 2020, the Nevada Art Museum and the Witte Museum featured Banovich in a one-man exhibition titled "The King of Beasts: A Study of the African Lion".

== Books ==
- King of Beasts: A Study of the African Lion by John Banovich, Live Oak Press, 2019
- Beast: The Collected Works of John Banovich, Banovich Fine Art Publishing, 2009
