= Charles-Emmanuel Sédillot =

French military physician and surgeon

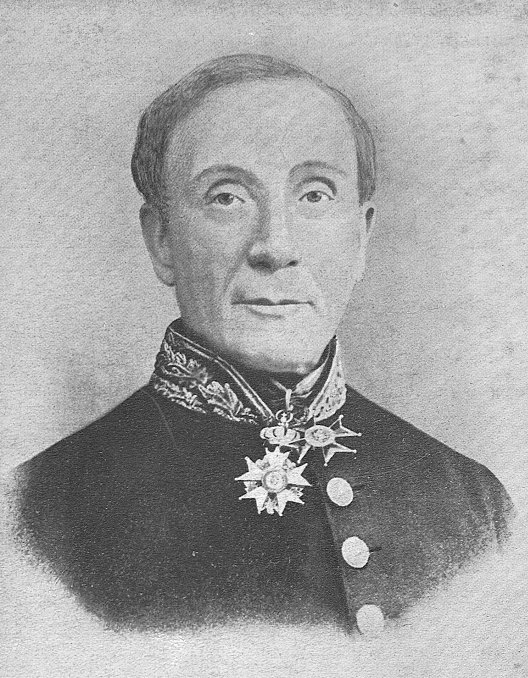
Charles-Emmanuel Sédillot (1869)

Charles-Emmanuel Sédillot (18 September 1804 – 29 January 1883) was a French military physician and surgeon. He was the son of orientalist Jean Jacques Emmanuel Sédillot (1777–1832), and an older brother to historian Louis-Pierre-Eugène Sédillot.

Born in Paris, he studied surgery under Alexis Boyer and Philibert Joseph Roux. In 1836 he became professor of operative surgery at Val-de-Grâce, followed by a professorship at Strasbourg five years later.

Sedillot was a pioneer of urethrotomic and gastrointestinal operations, and known for his work with dislocations and his treatment of pyaemia. He is credited with coining the term "microbe" (from micros "small" and bios "life").

== Selected writings ==
- Du nerf pneumo-gastrique et de ses fonctions (1829, doctoral thesis) - The pneumogastric nerve and its functions.
- Phlébite traumatique (1832, thesis for agrégation in surgery) Traumatic phlebitis.
- Campagne de Constantine de 1837 - Constantine Campaign (French North Africa).
- De l'opération de l'empyème, (second edition 1841) - Operation for empyema
- De l'infection purulente, ou, Pyoémie, 1849 - Purulent infection or pyemia.
- Traité de médecine opératoire : bandages et appareils (third edition 1865–66) - Treatise on operative medicine : bandages and devices.
- De l'uréthrotomie interne, 1858 - Internal urethrotomy.
- De l'Évidement sous-périosté des os (second edition 1867) - Subperiosteal recess of the bone.

== See also ==
- Émile Küss
