= Charlotte Towle =

American social worker, academic and writer

Charlotte Helen Towle (1896–1966) was an American social worker, academic and writer.

== Early life and education ==
Towle was born and raised in Butte, Montana. In 1919, she received a BA in Education from Goucher College. After graduation, she worked at the American Red Cross and became increasingly interested in social work. With financial support from a Commonwealth Fund fellowship, she attended New York School of Social Work (now the Columbia University School of Social Work). She earned a degree in Psychiatric Social Work in 1926.

== Career ==
Towle worked for two years (1926–1928) as the director of the Home Finding Department of The Children's Aid Society of Philadelphia. From 1928 to 1932, she did casework supervision and further trained in psychiatric social work at the Institute for Child Guidance in New York. "Established by the Commonwealth Fund as a model clinic, the Institute was in the forefront of psychiatric social work theory and practice. Towle served as the Institute's fieldwork supervisor for students from the New York and Smith College schools of social work."

In 1932, Towle was appointed to a full-time faculty position at the School of Social Service Administration at University of Chicago. In 1945, her most famous work, Common Human Needs, was published by the Federal Security Agency. A few years after the book came out, it became embroiled in the “Common Human Needs Affair.” The main problem was one use of the word “socialized,” where she meant socialization and not socialism. But in the context of the “red scare” of the 1950s, this gained traction. The head of the American Medical Association (AMA) called the book “viciously and malevolently un-American.” The book had been published by what is now the Department of Health and Human Services. The AMA was worried they were on the path toward universal health care, which they strongly opposed. Pitching this book as “socialist propaganda” was part of a larger crusade by them to paint all public assistance as “socialism” in order to prevent universal health care. The book and its plates were destroyed. But social workers saw great value and guidance in the book, so the biggest professional organization began printing and has been its publisher since.

1953-54 she taught the Dutch exchange student Cora Baltussen (1912-2005), who became renowned in the Netherlands.

== Death ==
Towle died in 1966.

== Published works ==
- Common Human Needs, Washington, DC: National Association of Social Workers, 1952. Revised edition 1987, National Association of Social Workers (NASW), ISBN 978-0871011541
- The emotional element in learning in education for social work: delivered at the twenty-ninth annual meeting, American Association of Schools of Social Work, January 1948 (now the Council on Social Work Education), New York: Council on Social Work Education, [1948?]
- The learner in education for the professions: as seen in education for social work., University of Chicago Press, 1954
- Some reflections on social work education. London, Family Welfare Association [1957?]
- Helping: Charlotte Towle on social work and social casework., Ann Arbor, MI : University Microfilms International, 1986.

Her literary remains of 26 boxes is archived at the University of Chicago Library.

Some of her works were translated and published in Dutch, French, German, and Japanese.

- Algemeen menselijke noden : begrippen van dynamische psychologie, toegepast op maatschappelijk werk, Roermond [etc.]: Romen & Zonen, 1955.
- Die emotionalen Grundbedürfnisse von Kindern und Erwachsenen., 1956
- Comprendre les besoins humains : les grandes tâches de l'attention à autrui. Paris: Éditions du Centurion, 1967.
- Theorieen over social casework, Deventer: Van Loghum Slaterus, 1975
