= Aaron Parrett =

American musician, author, and educator

- Born: Butte, Montana, U.S.
- Other name: Aaron C. Parrett
- Education: University of Georgia
- Occupations: Professor, author, letterpress printer, musician
- Known for: Montana: Then and Now, Literary Butte, and Montana Americana Music

Aaron Parrett is an American musician, author, letterpress printer, and educator. He is currently professor of English Literature at the University of Providence in Great Falls, Montana. A considerable portion of his academic and written work deals with the genre of science fiction or the state of Montana.

== Biography ==
Born in Butte, Montana, Parrett earned a PhD in Comparative Literature in 2001 from the University of Georgia.

His first academic book, The Translunar Narrative in the Western Tradition (Ashgate, 2004), examined the dream of traveling to the Moon in literature, culminating in the Apollo Program of the 1960s and early 1970s that achieved the millennia-long vision of leaving Earth. A considerable portion of his academic work deals with the genre of science fiction. His other works have focused on his home state of Montana, including Montana: Then and Now (Bangtail, 2014), Literary Butte (History Press, 2015) and Montana Americana Music (Arcadia, 2016), for which prize-winning author Smith Henderson wrote the foreword. He won the Montana Historical Society's Peoples' Choice Award for his essay, "Montana's Worst Natural Disaster," about the devastating 1964 flood that killed 30 Native American Indians on the Blackfeet Reservation.

As a result of his Montana writings, he has been featured on many radio programs and was a featured guest on Anthony Bourdain's Parts Unknown television segment on Butte. He serves as president of the Drumlummon Institute, a non-profit whose mission is "to promote and publish art and literatures created in Montana and the broader American West."

Parrett is also a songwriter and composer. His first album of original songs, The Sinners (Pizzle Records, 1996), earned critical acclaim (rereleased in 2015), yielding "Texas," a song recorded by several artists, including the southern Americana band Stewart and Winfield. His songs have been featured in several Emmy-nominated documentary films, including Libby, Montana (High Plains Films, 2007) and The Naturalist (2004). A lyric from his song "El Cuchillo" is referenced in leading Steinbeck scholar Bob DeMott's Afield: American Writers on Bird Dogs (2014). Parrett made a full-length recording as a joint effort with IBMA songwriter of the year, Ivan Rosenberg, called Stumbo Lost Wages (Pizzle Records, 2009). In 2024, he, Jon Flynn, and John Dendy formed The State Champions, and released Independent Record. It received strongly positive reviews.

He is also co-founder of the Territorial Press, along with master letterpress printer and book artist Peter Rutledge Koch. The press' catalogue includes Himself Adrift (2016) by Matt Pavelich, Curses (2015) by Aaron Parrett, and Maple and Lead (2017) by Aaron Parrett, featuring wood-engraved illustrations by artist Seth Taylor Roby.
