= George Makepeace Towle =

American lawyer and politician (1841–1893)

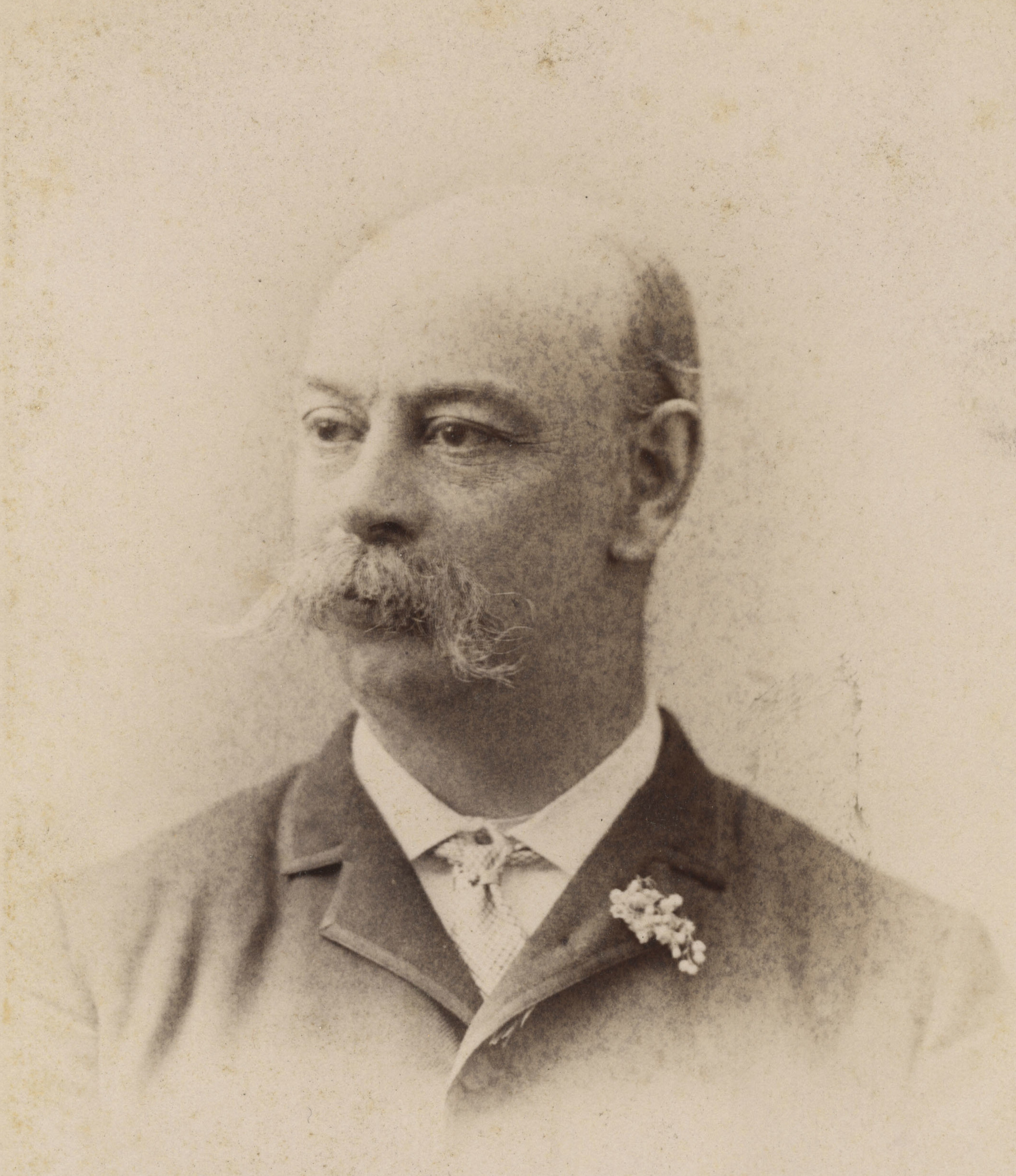
- George Makepeace Towle; from the State Library of Massachusetts
- Born: 27 August 1841; Washington, D.C., U.S.
- Died: 9 August 1893 (aged 51); Brookline, Massachusetts, U.S.
- Occupations: Lawyer; politician; author

George Makepeace Towle (August 27, 1841 – August 9, 1893) was an American lawyer, politician, and author. He is best known for his translations of Jules Verne's works, in particular his 1873 translation of Around the World in Eighty Days.

== Life ==
Towle was born in Washington, D.C., the son of Nathaniel C. Towle and Eunice Makepeace Towle. He earned degrees in arts from Yale University in 1861 and in law from the Harvard Law School in 1863, and practised in Boston in 1863–65. He was United States consul at Nantes, France, in 1866–68, and in the latter year was transferred to the consulate at Bradford, England, where he remained until his return to Boston in 1870. One of his many prominent friends was Charles Dickens, to whose periodical, All the Year Round, he contributed several articles on American affairs.

Towle became president of the Papyrus club in 1880, and was a delegate to the Republican national convention at Chicago in 1888. He was managing editor of the Boston Commercial Bulletin in 1870–71, and foreign editor of the Boston Post in 1871–76, and became a contributor to many foreign and American periodicals and took an active part in the literary life publishing over 50 books and articles and giving public lectures on topics of the day.

In early 1873 Towle started collaborating with the American publisher James R. Osgood on translations of Verne. He continued to translate the Verne novels until the bankruptcy of the firm in 1876. The translations are of a uniformly high quality.

On September 16, 1866, in Paris, Towle married Nellie Lane of Boston, who survived him. Towle died in Brookline after a long illness culminating in paralysis of the brain, and was buried in Mount Auburn Cemetery. He had no children.

== Selected works ==
- Glimpses of History (Boston, 1865)
- The History of Henry the Fifth, King of England (New York, 1866)
- American Society (2 vols., London, 1870)
- The Eastern Question: Modern Greece (Boston, 1877)
- Principalities of the Danube: Serbia and Roumania (1877)
- Beaconsfield (New York, 1878)
- Young Folks' Heroes of History, including "Vasco da Gama", "Pizarro", "Magellan", "Marco Polo", "Raleigh", and "Drake" (6 vols.. Boston, 1878–82)
- Modern France, 1851-79 (New York, 1887)

Selected translations

- Jules Verne, Around the World in Eighty Days, James Osgood, Boston: 1873, reprinted by Sampson Low.
- Jules Verne, Dr. Ox and Other Stories, James Osgood, Boston: 1874, reprinted by Sampson Low, London: 1874.
- Jules Verne, The Wreck of the Chancellor and Martin Paz, James Osgood, Boston: 1874.
