= Milan Ressel =

Czech painter (1934–2020)

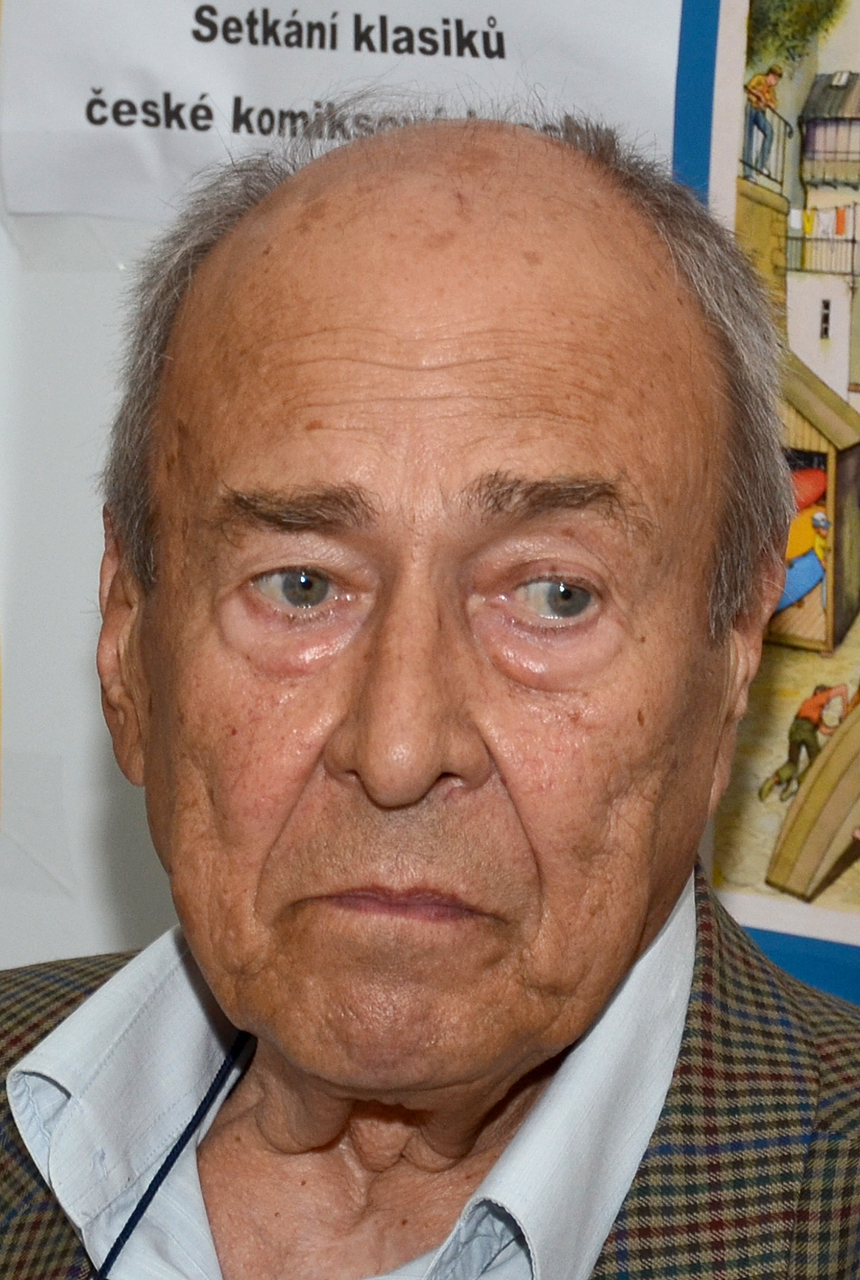
- Milan Ressel (2017)
- Born: 1 December 1934; Prague
- Died: 16 July 2020 (aged 85); Prague
- Education: Academy of Fine Arts, Prague
- Known for: painter, printmaker, illustrator, restorer

Milan Ressel (1 December 1934, Ostrava - 16 July 2020, Prague) was a Czech painter, printmaker, illustrator and restorer.

== Life ==
Milan Ressel was the son of Alfred Ressel, a Czechoslovak army officer who fled with his entire family to England via Hungary, Yugoslavia and France under dramatic circumstances at the turn of 1939/1940. As a major general, he commanded the artillery of the 1st Czechoslovak Army Corps in the Soviet Union since 1944. Milan's older brother Fred enlisted in the British Army in 1944 and took part in the siege of Dunkirk. After the war the family returned to Czechoslovakia. His father was discharged from the army in the early 1950s and worked for a year and a half in the coal mines in Ostrava, then in Prague car repair shops and in an advertising company.

As a young boy Milan Ressel experienced the heavy bombing of London at the turn of 1940–1941, and his wartime experiences and his personal acquaintance with English literature for the young later influenced his work. After returning to Prague, he studied at the Higher School of Arts and Crafts in Prague (1949-1953) and from 1953 to 1959 at the Academy of Fine Arts in Prague with prof. Miloslav Holý, Karel Minář, Karel Souček. His friends included Karel Nepraš, Bedřich Dlouhý, Jaroslav Vožniak and Theodor Pištěk. He was a founding member and first goalkeeper of the Paleta vlasti hockey club and a member of the Association of Prague Painters. Since the 1970s, he has been a freelance artist, comic book creator, illustrator, graphic designer and mural restorer.

Milan Ressel lived and worked in Prague and Středokluky near Prague.

== Work ==
In the 1960s, he belonged to the circle of artists who devoted themselves to informel, and his free work was influenced by his friendship with artists from the Šmidra group (Koblasa, Nepraš, Dlouhý, Vožniak). The search for the artist's distinctive style was shaped between an inclination towards classical painting and the need to experiment. His abstract paintings from 1965 to 1966 contain hints of real objects and do not lose touch with the sensory world.

In the second half of the 1960s he devoted himself almost exclusively to drawing. From smaller formats, he gradually worked his way up to monumental compositions. His utopian illustrations, which are close in content to Ray Bradbury's science fiction, are based on rational reflections on the real prospects of civilization and on the artist's sheer imagination.

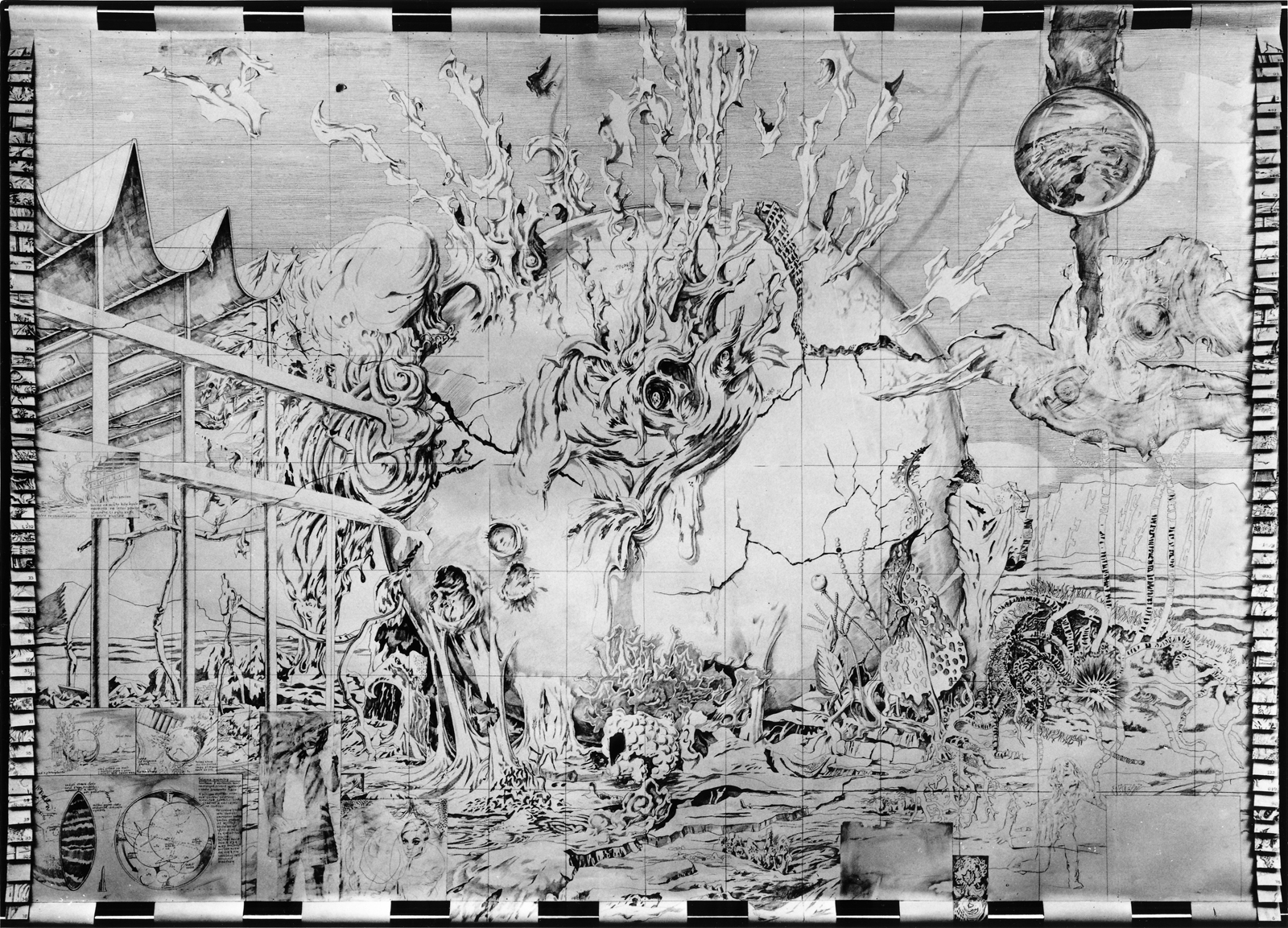
Japanese Pavilion, drawing (1965)

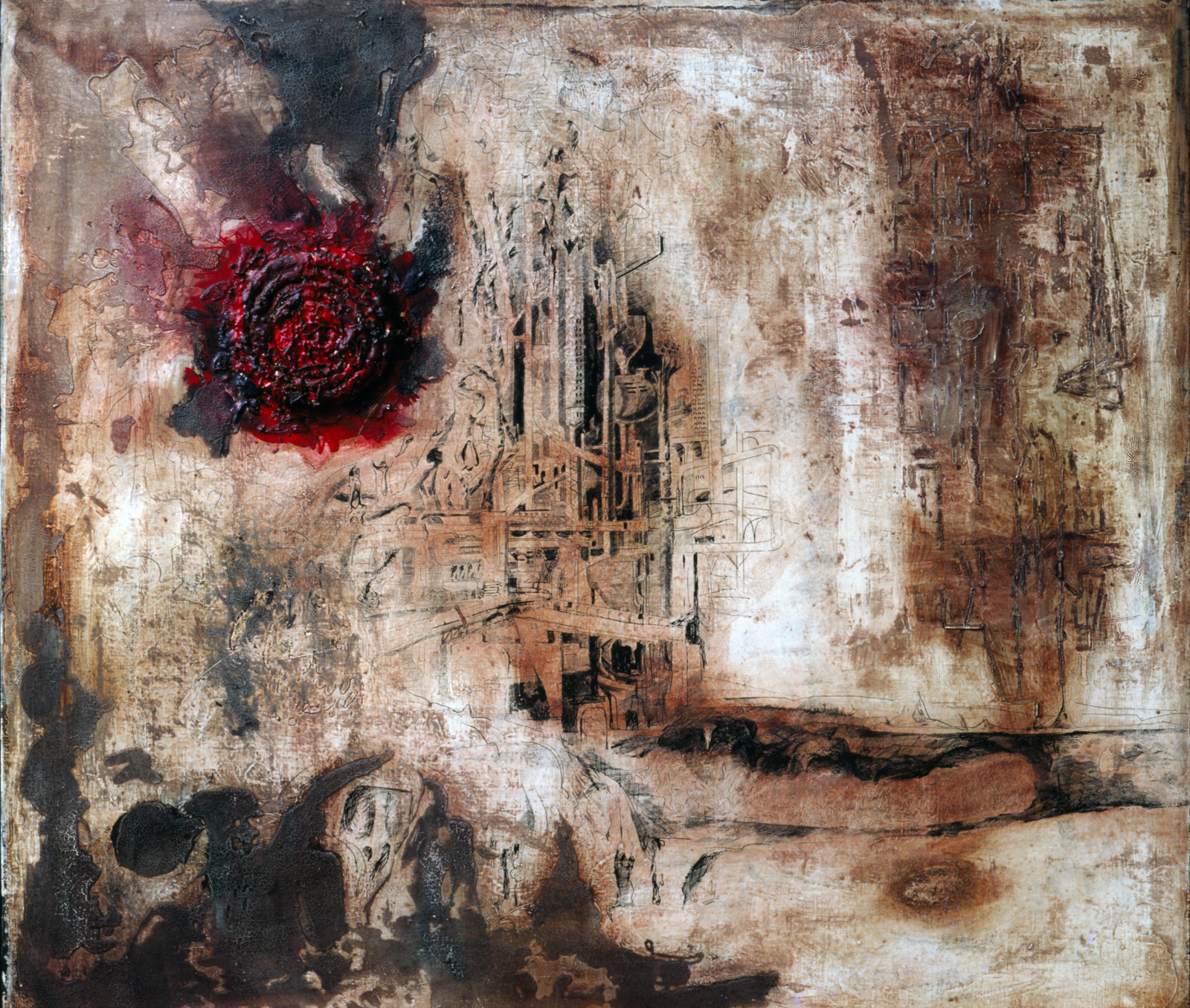
Doomed City, comb. tech. (1966)

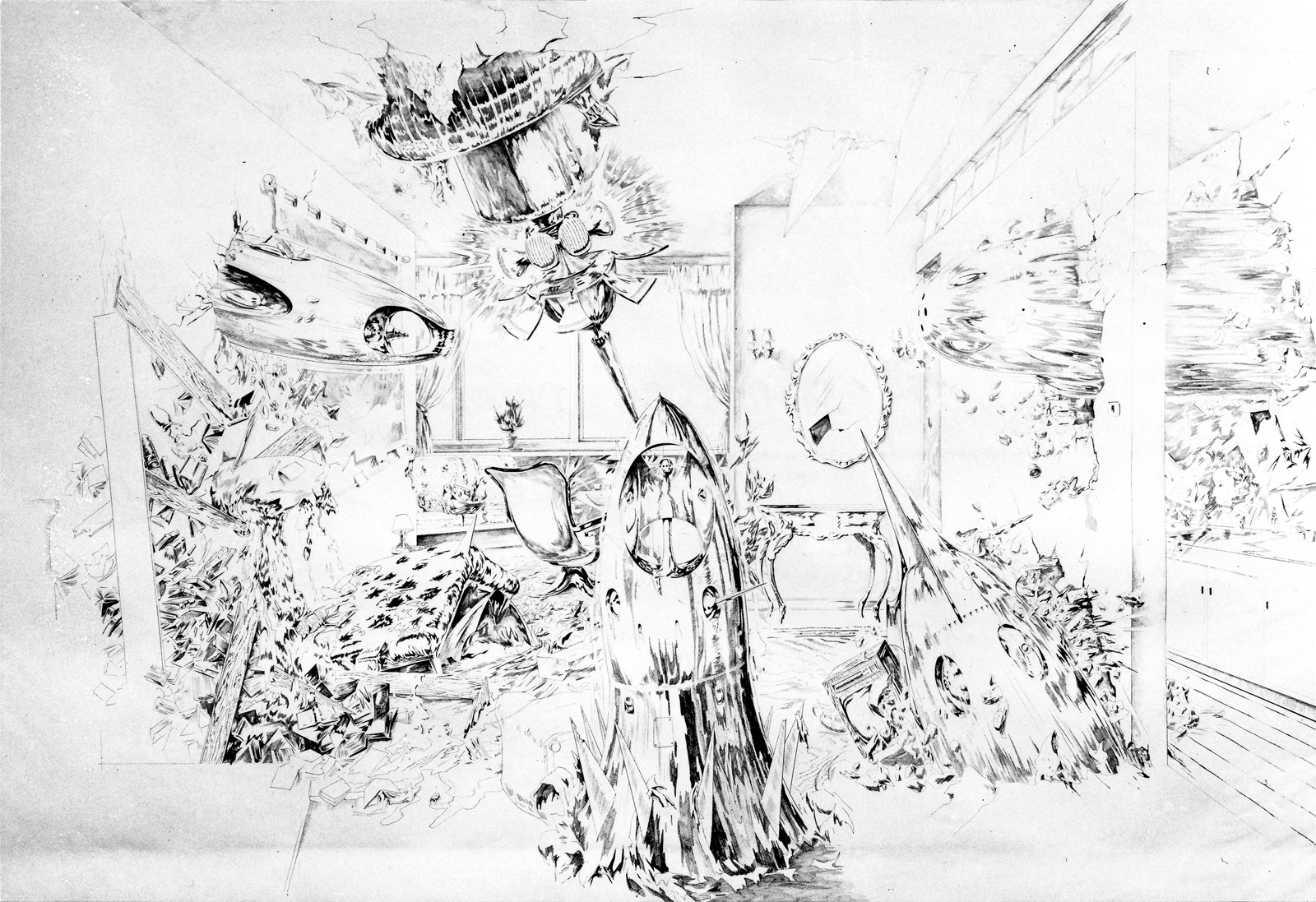
Penetrations (1969)

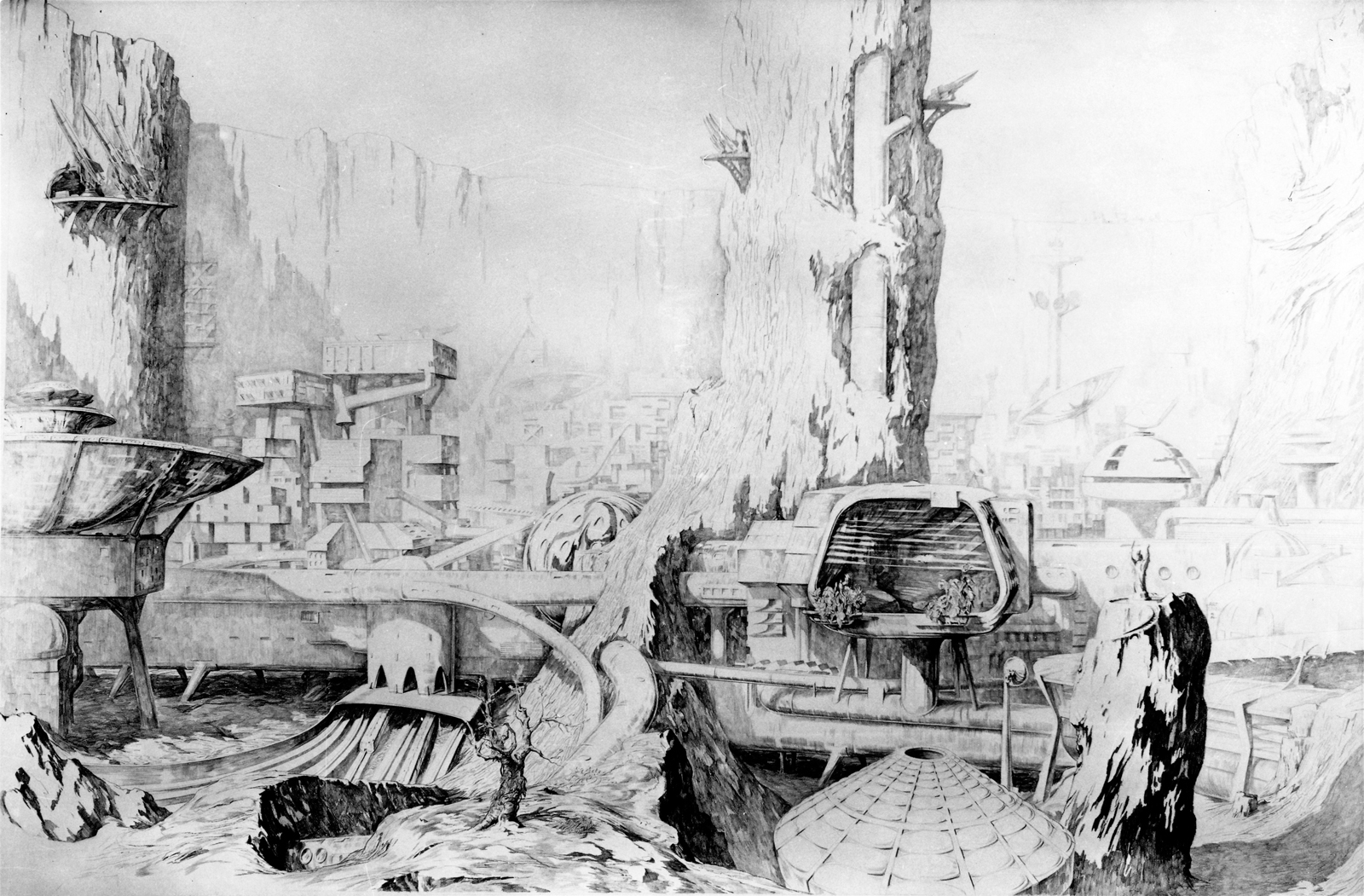
Splendid Isolation (1978)

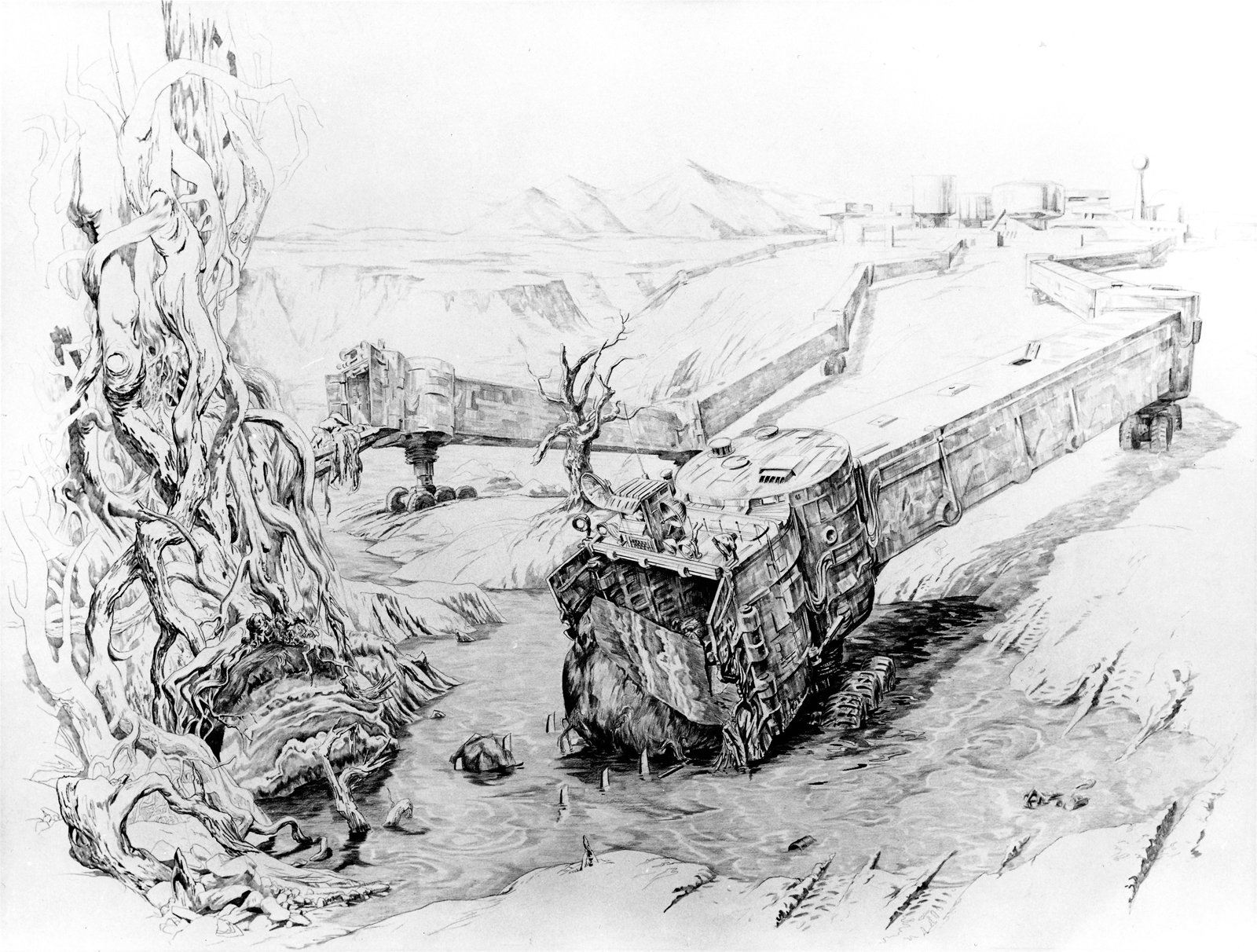
Czech agate, b&w photo of colour drawing (1970)

Ressel does not succumb to the fascination of the development of technology, but he does conjecture its effects on the devastation of nature and on the life of contemporary man. The drawings, with their abundance of minute detail, depict a world full of uncertainty and warning signs of possible self-destruction through war catastrophy or over-exploitation of nature. They express a certain anxiety about the cold modern architectures and industrial networks that increasingly surround nature. His compositions juxtapose the earthly and the cosmic, the ephemeral and the permanent, the vegetative and the organic with the technical and the inanimate. He acknowledges beauty and magical appeal to the world of machines and technology, which is a projection of human dreaming of distant worlds. He sees them as a natural part of reality and rather seeks the possibilities of mutual symbiosis and harmony.

In 1969 he accepted the offer of editor-in-chief Jiří Bínek to draw comic strips based on scripts by Ludvík Souček (Ten-eyed, Kraken) for the youth magazine Ohníček. He was offered another job by the editor Vlastislav Toman, who, in the temporarily freer atmosphere of the late 1960s, pushed the comic strip The Adventures of John Carter into the ABC magazine. In 1973 he illustrated Ludvík Souček's science fiction short stories The Interest of the Galaxy and in the 1980s he illustrated Jules Verne's book The Secret of Wilhelm Storitz (Mladá fronta, 1985) and Svatopluk Hrnčír's Země Zet (1990). Some of Ressel's comic strips are considered classics of the genre. During the normalization he also made his living as a restorer.

In the 1980s Milan Ressel returned to painting. Compared to his drawings, his paintings show a simplification of pictorial composition and an open space that invites free play of imagination. The basic realism of colours and forms is preserved, but there are different patterns that are beyond the visual experience of the real world. Most of the paintings are composed as a stage space set in a landscape, bordered by backdrops of trees, architecture or rocks. The artist reconsiders the ordinary relations of reality according to the logic of dreams and explores the psychic resonances of unexpected encounters, confronting technology and nature with each other and being inspired by the mystery of associations. The relativization of spatial relations and the "mannerist" use of perspective are also means of evoking an atmosphere of fiction. There are frequent quotations of works by other artists in new contexts (Bosch, Gaudí, Moore, Vyšší Brod (Hohenfurth) cycle).

The space of the paintings is impersonal and "depopulated". The human trace appears in them through various references, but the figure appears in Ressel's paintings only from the mid-1990s onwards. In the composition This Is Us (1996), the figures emerge from the painting onto the stage in the foreground, but they are all deliberately static, and the ambiguity of the content is confirmed by the artist's static fixation of two figures on sticks stuck into the carpet.

Milan Ressel depicts reality without imitating it. His painting is built as much on spontaneity as on an intellectually meditative component.

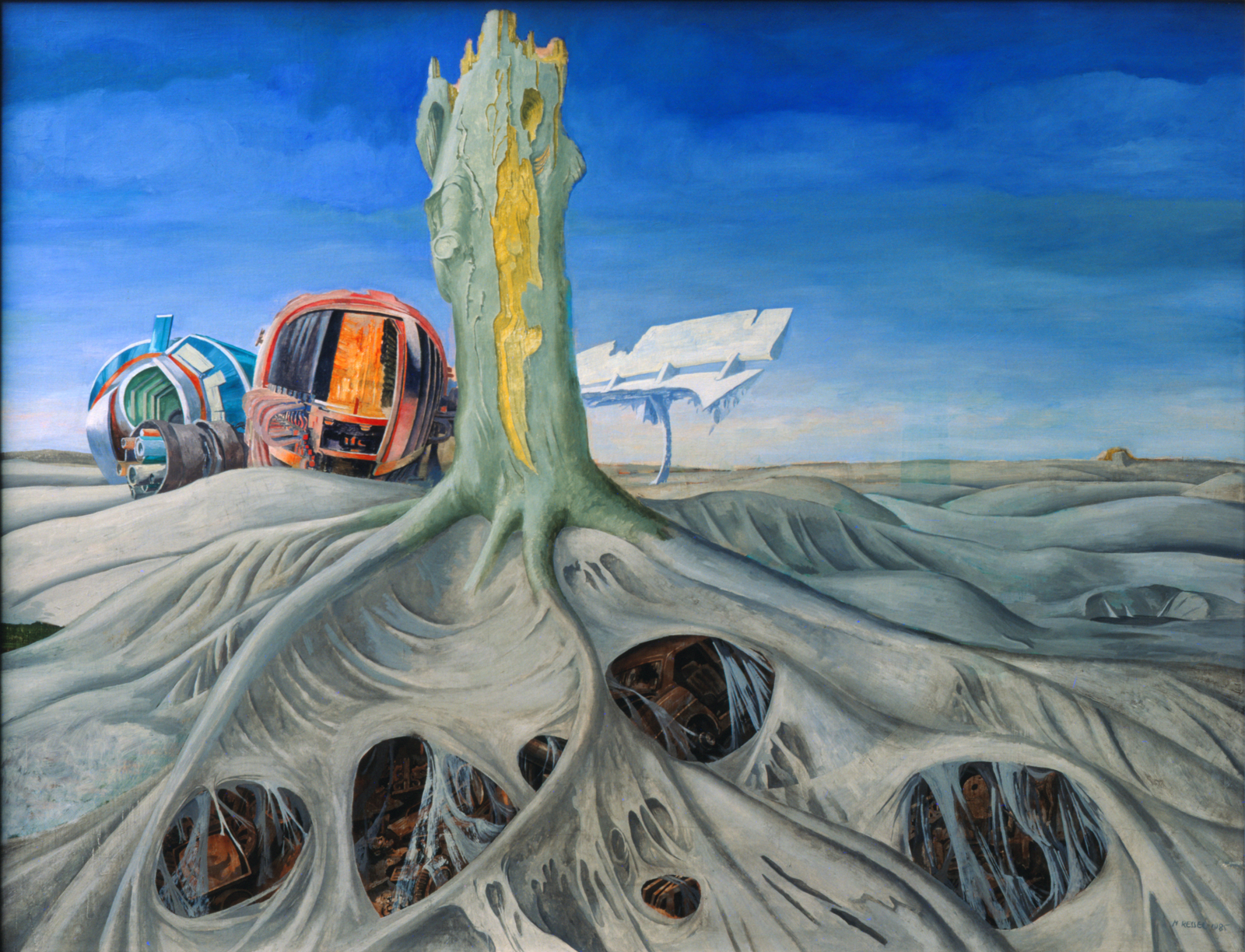
Tree (1986)

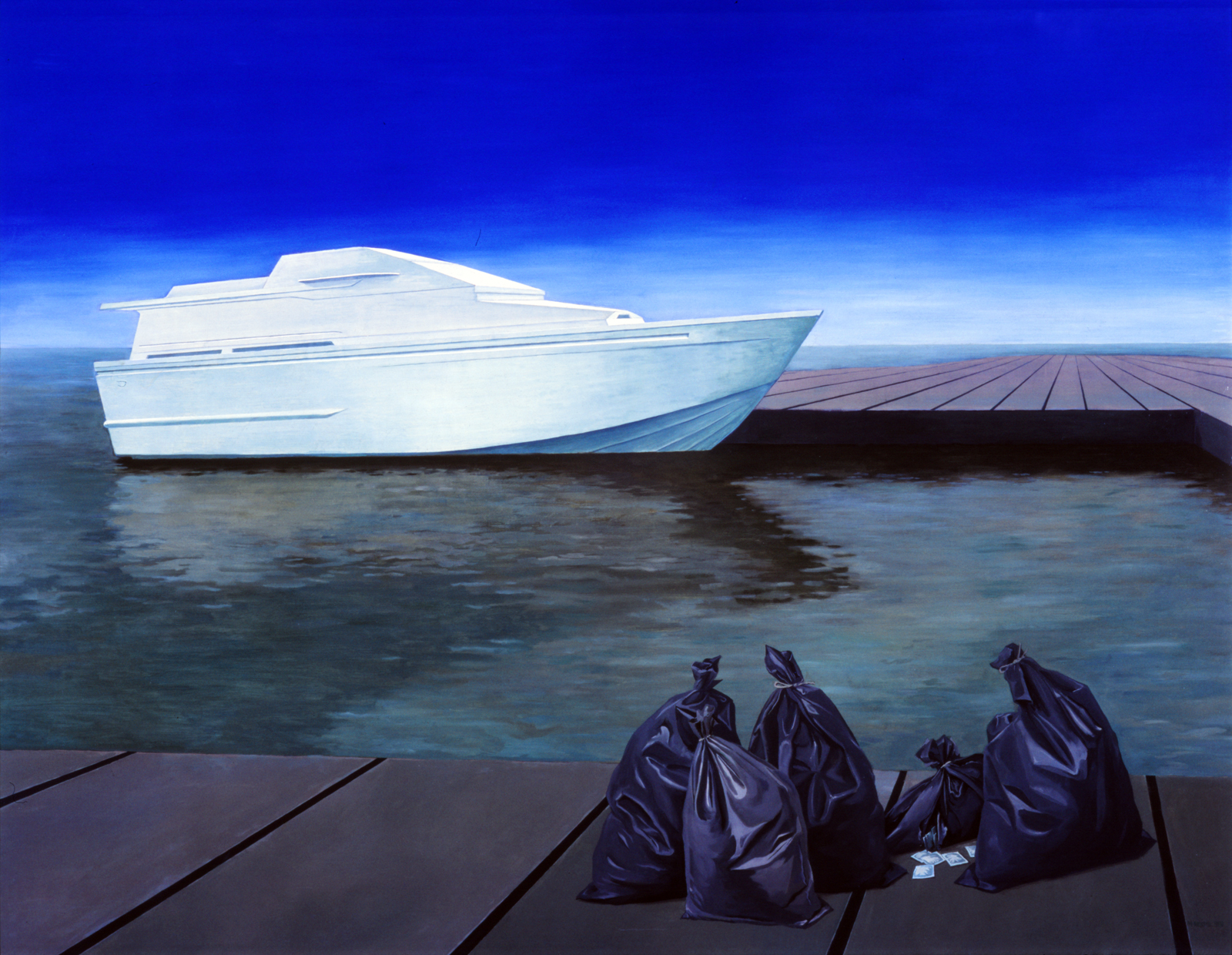
Routes II (1988)

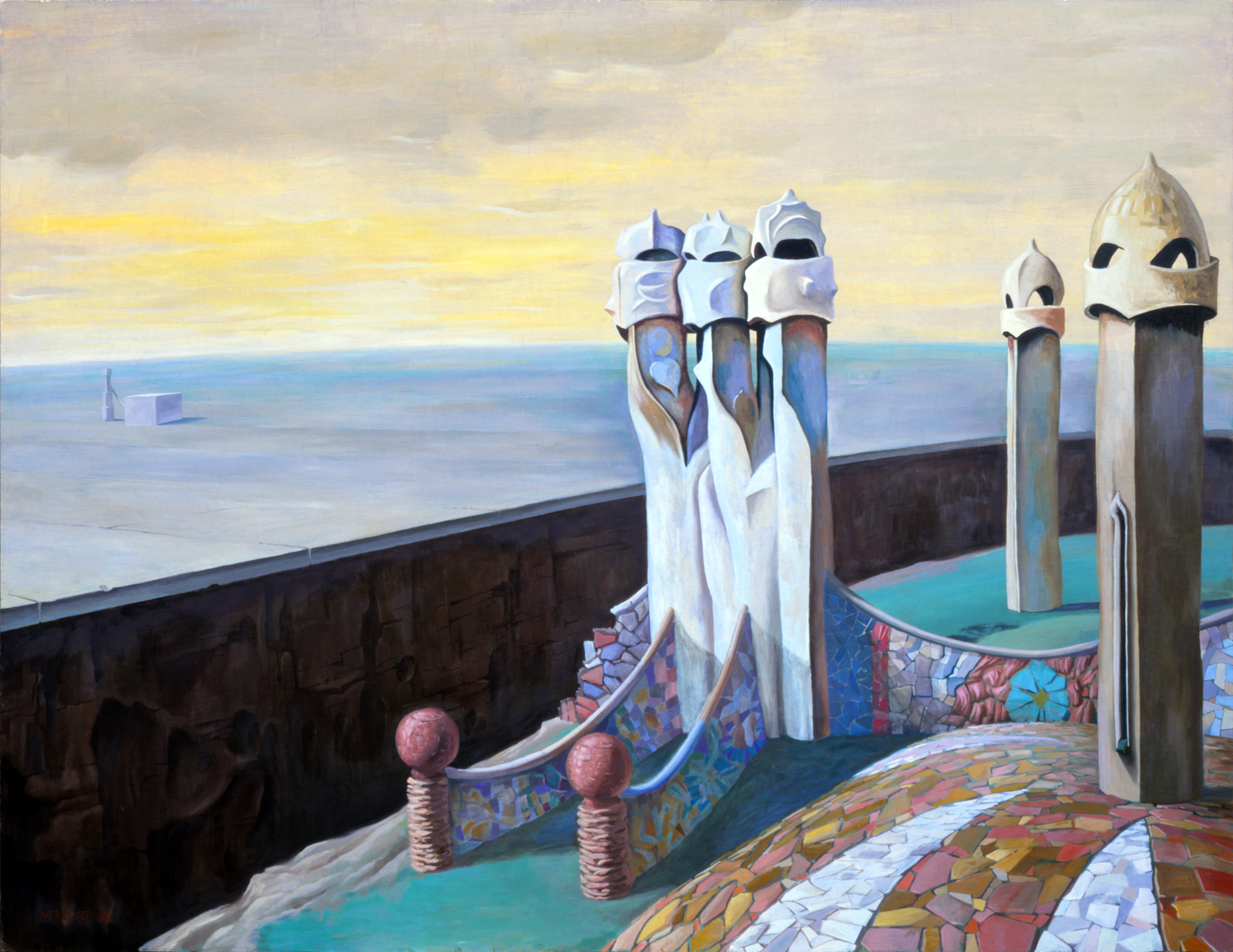
Gaudí's Garden (1992)

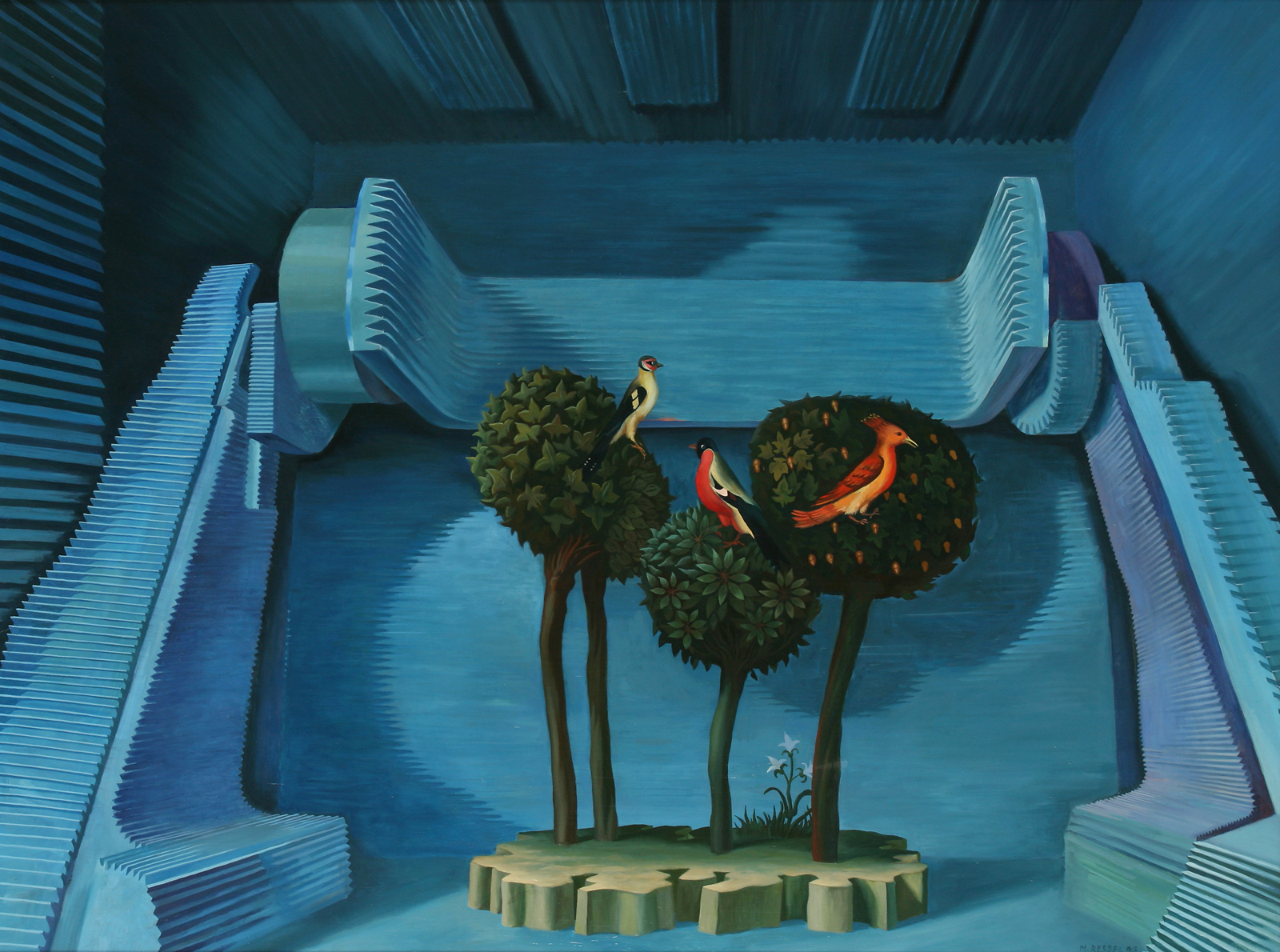
Singing Island, 1993, AJG Hluboká

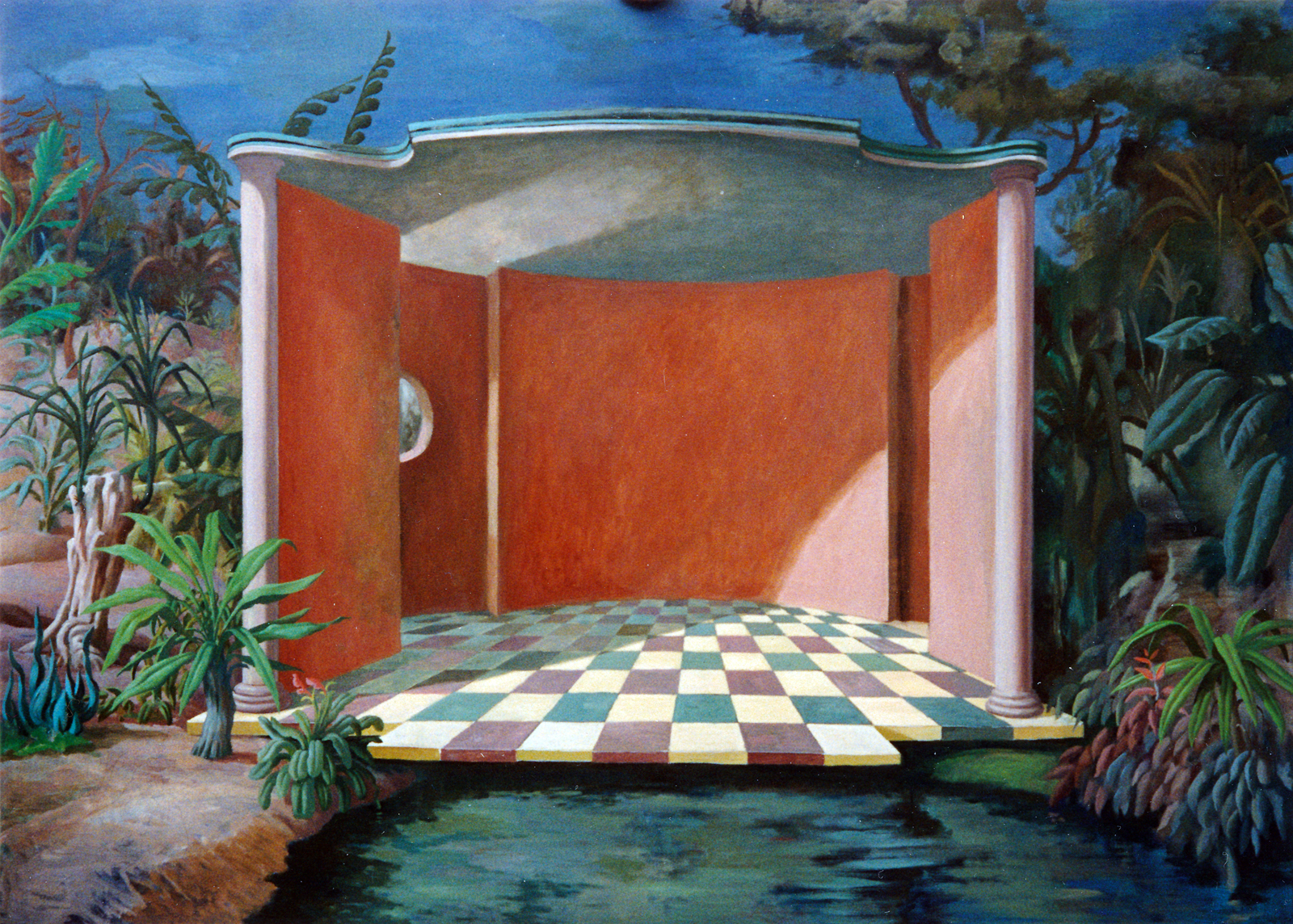
Garden Pavilion (1994-1995)

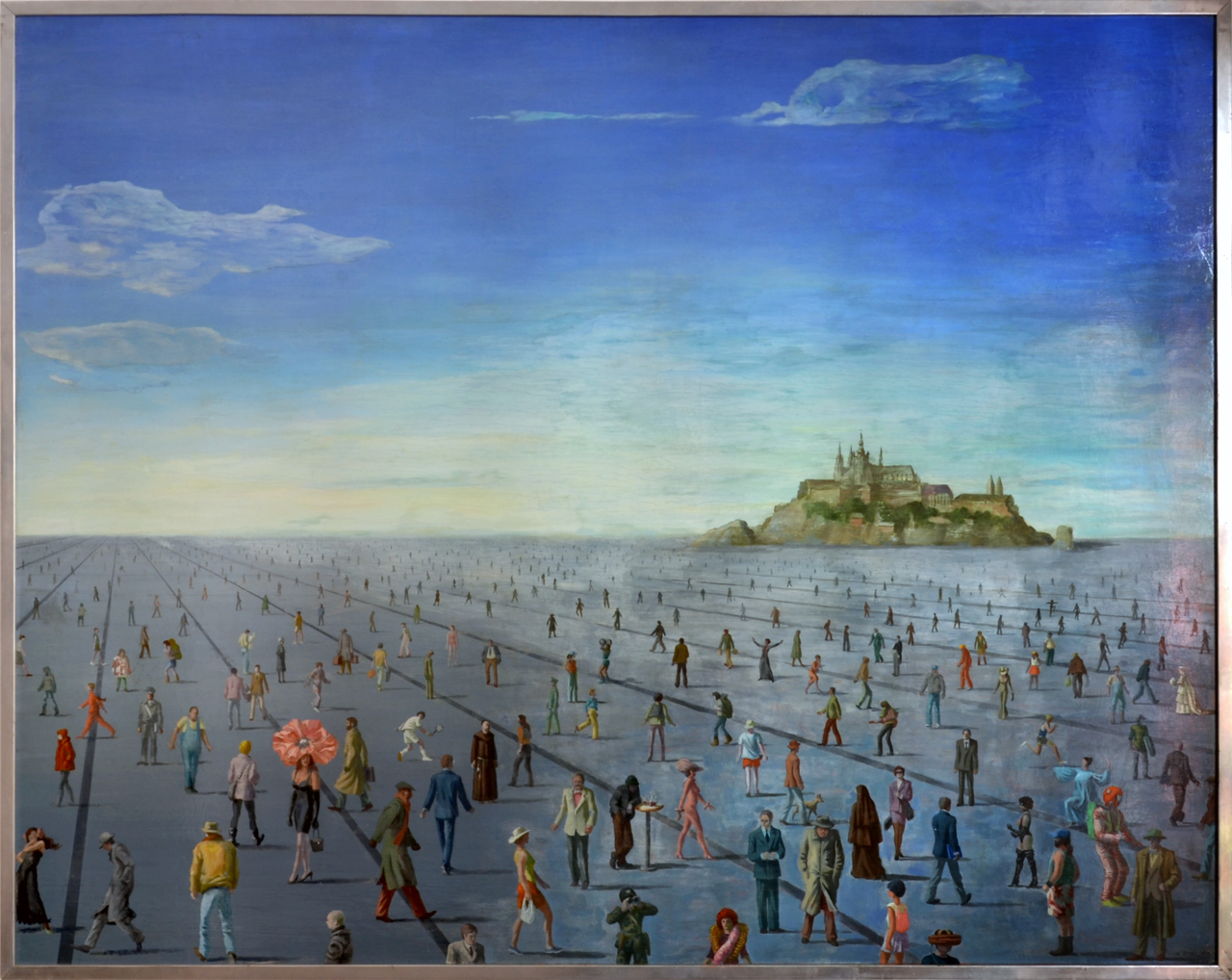
You and us (1996)

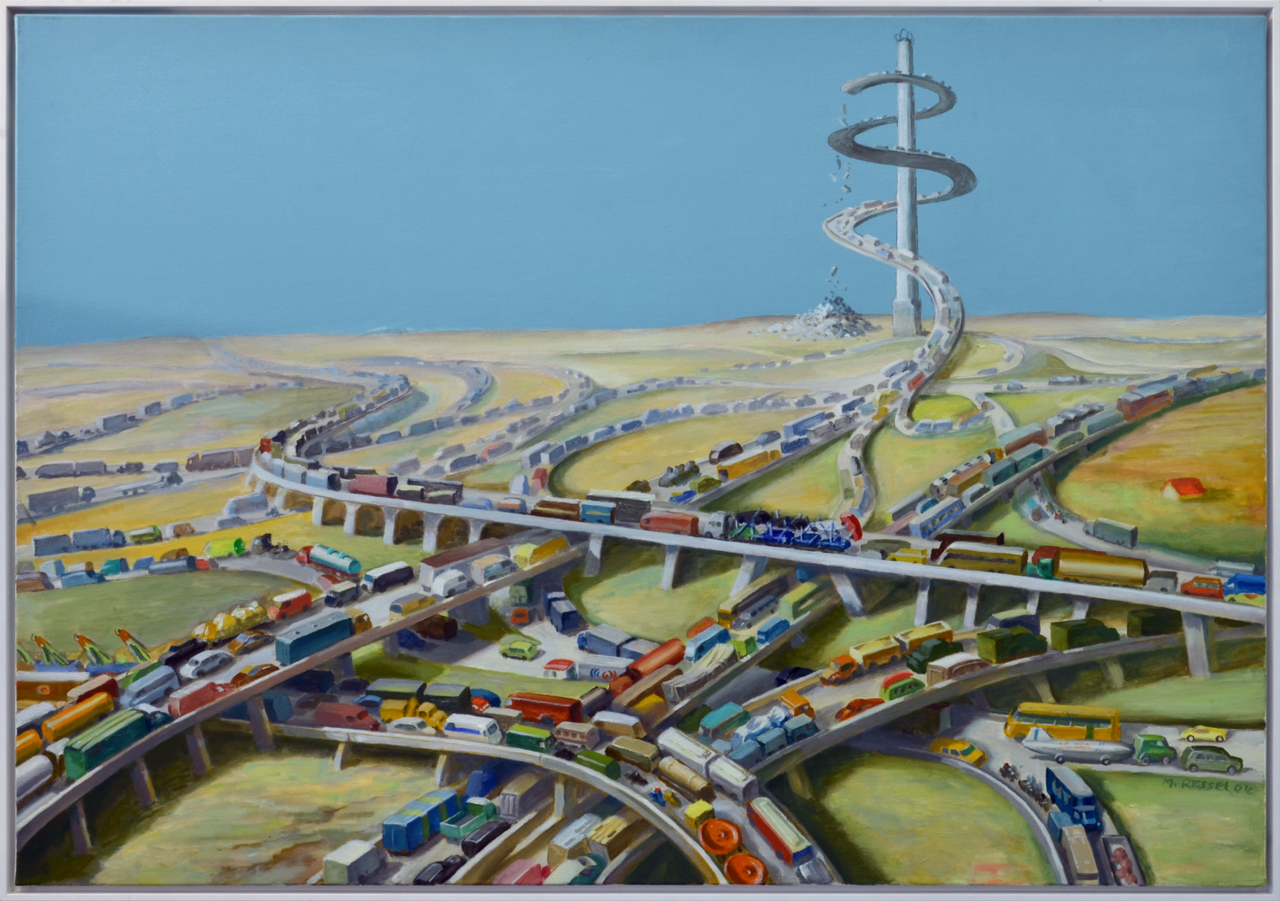
We Should Have Taken the A9 and Then Gone Back to the R12 (2004)

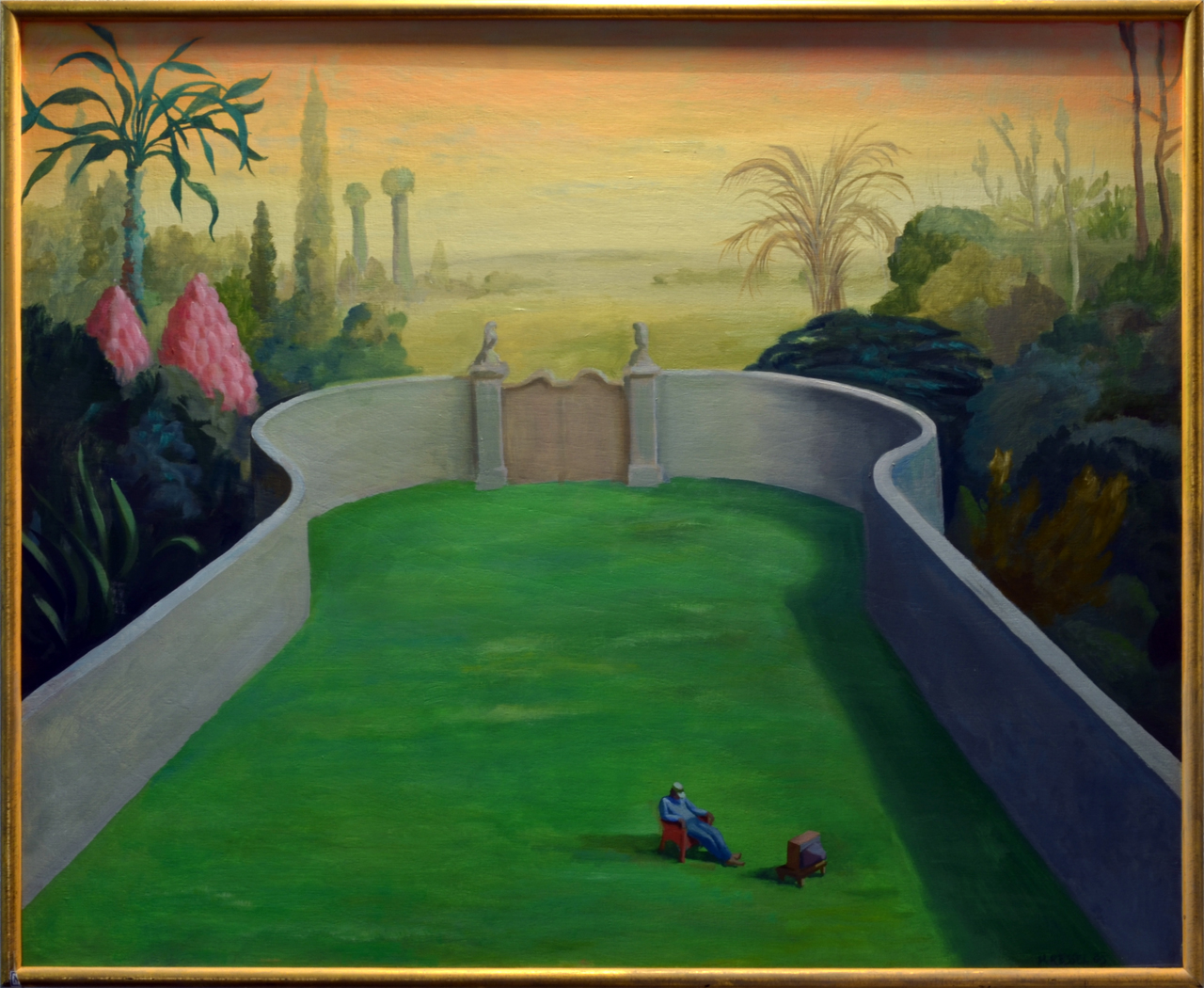
The Thirteenth Chamber (2005)

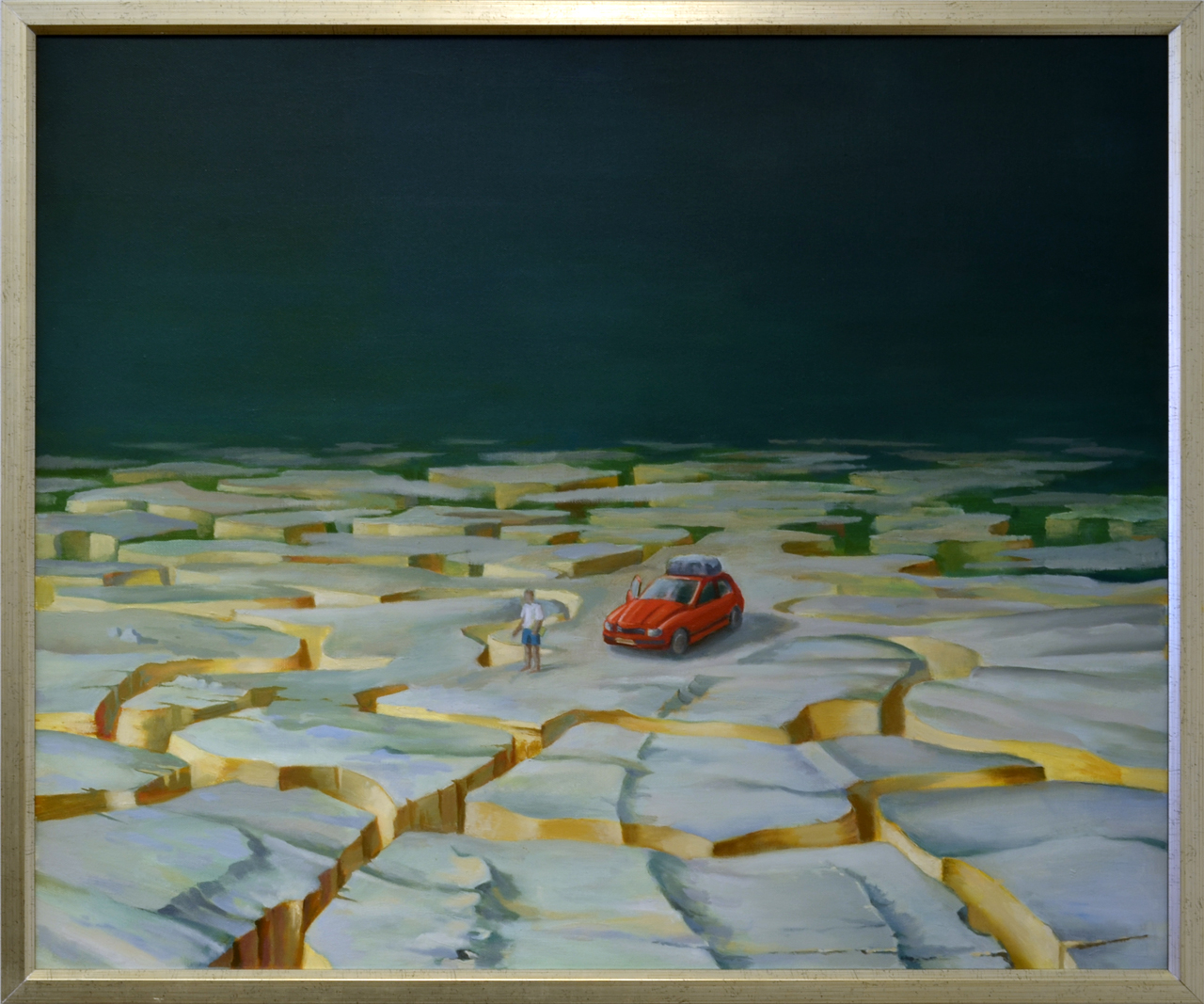
Journey to Florence I (2007)

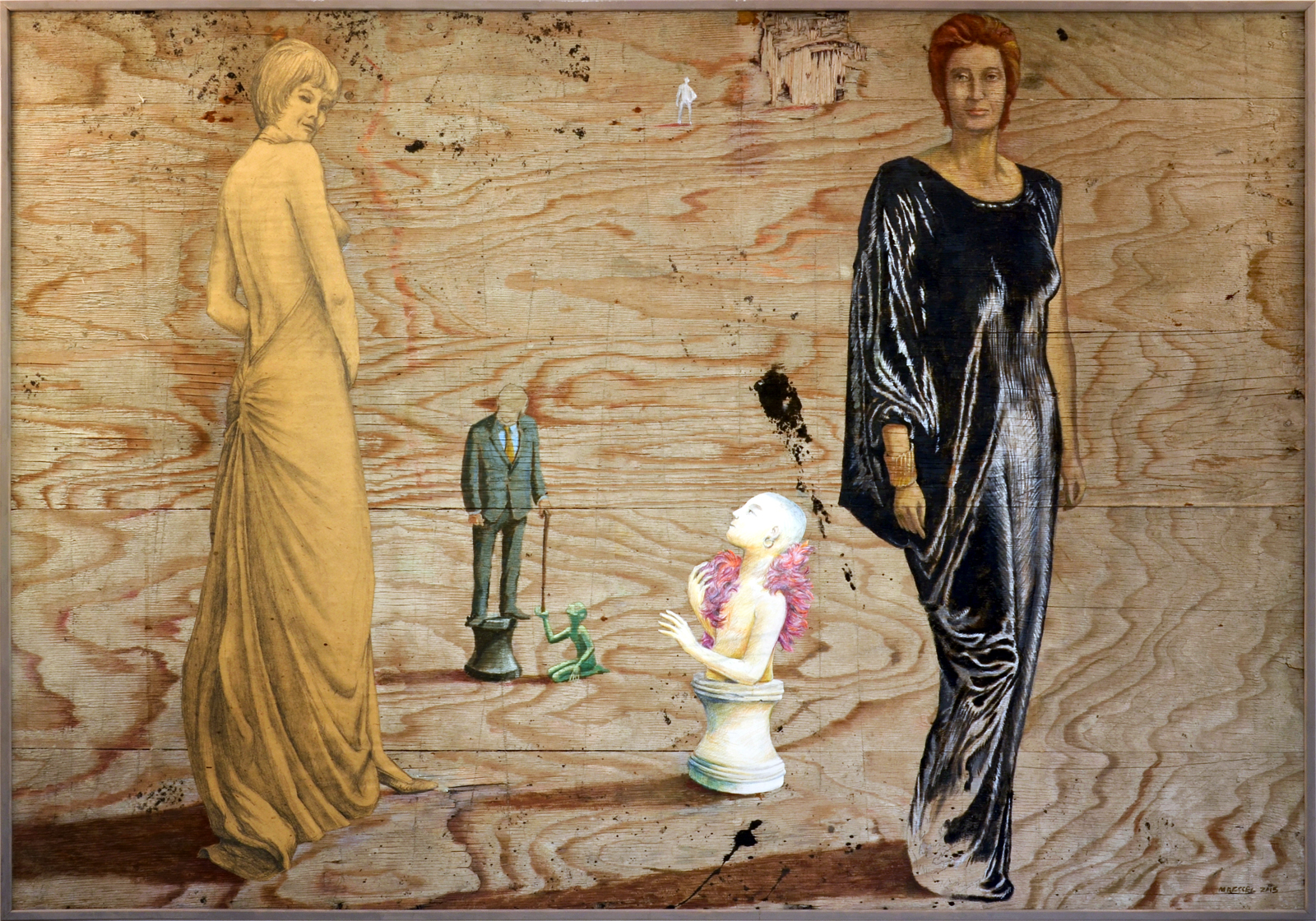
Ours (2015)

=== Restoration work (selection) ===
- Painted ceilings, Martinic Palace in Prague
- Fresco paintings of the Great Hall, Lobkowicz Palace at Prague Castle
- Frescoes by Mikoláš Aleš at the Štorch House in Prague

=== Illustrations (selection) ===
- Ludvík Souček, The Interest of the Galaxy, Mladá fronta, Prague 1973
- Vlastislav Toman / Milan Ressel, The Adventures of Thuvia of Ptarh, based on E. R. Burroughs, follows The Adventures of John Carter, ABC magazine 1-24/XV,
- Jules Verne, The Secret of Wilhelm Storitz, Mladá fronta, Prague 1985
- Svatopluk Hrnčíř, Země Zet, comics, Book Business Club 1990

=== Representation in collections ===
- National Gallery in Prague
- Aleš South Bohemian Gallery in Hluboká nad Vltavou
- Art Gallery Karlovy Vary
- Gallery of Modern Art in Hradec Králové
- Rabas Gallery, Rakovník
- Arturo Schwarz Gallery, Milano
- private collections at home and abroad

=== Exhibitions ===
- 1970 Moravian Museum Brno
- 1971 Milan Ressel, Havířov City Gallery, Krnov City Museum
- 1972 Mladá fronta Gallery Prague
- 1979 Šumperk Municipal Theatre
- 1980 Exhibition Hall of the Bruntál Castle (with V. Svoboda)
- 1983 Groll Gallery, Nuremberg
- 1988/1989 Milan Ressel: Paintings, drawings, Vincenc Kramář Gallery, Prague
- 1993 Milan Ressel: drawings, graphics, Galerie Chagall, Ostrava
- 1994 Hotel Spiritka Prague, S. Agostino Monastery, Pietrasanta
- 1996 Milan Ressel: Paintings, Drawings, Hluboká nad Vltavou Castle
- 1998 Milan Ressel: BIG MAC and other paintings and drawings, Municipal Gallery Art Club, Týn nad Vltavou
- 2000 Milan Ressel: Paintings, Liběchov Chateau
- 2005 Milan Ressel: Private labyrinths/paintings, drawings, prints, Nostic Palace, Prague
- 2011/2012 Milan Ressel: Something Changes, Something Remains..., Wortner House of the Aleš South Bohemian Gallery, České Budějovice
- 2012/2013 Milan Ressel, Rabas Gallery, Exhibition Hall under the High Gate, Rakovník
- 2015 Milan Ressel, Eighty. We and You, Millennium Gallery Prague

== Sources ==
=== Catalogues ===
- Milan Ressel, 1970, Grůza Antonín, cat. 4 p., Krnov Museum
- Milan Ressel: Paintings, Drawings, 1988, Kříž Jan, cat. 12 p., SČVU Praha
- Milan Ressel: Paintings, drawings, 1996, Tetiva Vlastimil, cat. 48 p., Alšova jihočeská galerie v Hluboká nad Vltavou
- Milan Ressel: Private Labyrinths: Paintings, Drawings, Prints, 2005, Koenigsmark Alex, Tetiva Vlastimil, cat. 36 p., VIVO, publishing house and gallery, Prague
- Milan Ressel, 2012, cat. 16 p., Rabas Gallery Rakovník
