= Jan Šejna =

Czech military leader(1927–1997)

Jan Šejna (12 May 1927 – 23 August 1997) was a Czech military leader. In the time of communist Czechoslovakia, he was a Major General of the Czechoslovak Army. After losing political power and influence at the beginning of the Prague Spring, he sought refuge in the US consulate in Trieste and defected to the United States. He is the second highest-ranked officer to ever defect to the West from the Eastern Bloc, behind Lieutenant General Ion Mihai Pacepa of the Romanian Securitate. A significant motive for his escape were his economic crimes. Among others, he illegally supplied collective farms with clover seed, hence he got nickname "The Seed General" (Semínkový generál).

== Life ==
=== Rise to power ===
Šejna wa born on 12 May 1927 in Radhostice, Czechoslovakia. During the 1950s and 1960s, Šejna rose through the ranks of the Communist Party of Czechoslovakia (KSČ) thanks to his political contacts and friends – like with Antonín Novotný Jr., the son of President Antonín Novotný and General Lomský at the Ministry of National Defence (Ministerstvo národní obrany, MNO) – built up a privileged position in the Czechoslovak People's Army.

In 1956, he became Chief of the Secretariat of the MNO, in 1963 the Chief Secretary of the Main Committee of the Communist Party of Czechoslovakia at the MNO. In October 1967, he was promoted to the rank of General. He fully supported Stalinist practices of suppression and intimidation.

Before the Prague Spring of 1968 began, the Czechoslovak Communist Party and affiliated members of the Soviet regime sought change through new leadership. Novotný's position as First Secretary (since 1953) and President (since 1957) weakened.

There were soon speculations about Šejna's personal participation in the planned military action of the army to support Novotný in the first weeks of 1968. Expecting backlash from reformers, "… General Jan Šejna convinced the presidium of the Main Party Committee in the Ministry of Defense to send to the Central Committee a petition … insisting on Novotný's retention as first secretary." When Šejna failed to bring about Novotný's reinstatement, he began plotting a military coup, a plan which failed to gain support as well.

Novotný was finally replaced by Alexander Dubček, a reform-minded member of the Czechoslovak party presidium, as leader of the party.

=== Losing power, changing sides ===
Losing his political influence, Šejna was under investigation for corruption: "… the official case against General Šejna was limited to charges that he had allegedly misappropriated 300,000 CSK ($20,000) worth of state-owned alfalfa and clover seed". However, before he could be arrested he defected in February 1968 with his son and his son's fiancée to Italy and settled in the US.

News of Šejna's indictment and defection quickly spread through Czechoslovakia's increasingly open press. He soon came to be known as "Clover Seed General" for his alleged massive embezzlement of clover.

Šejna was granted asylum in the United States, much to the dismay of Soviet authorities and became an intelligence source for American agencies and policy makers. According to Czechoslovak ambassador Duda, it was ironic that, "Šejna, who represented the worst elements of the conservative clique in Prague, should find haven in the United States".

In 1970, Šejna was sentenced by Czechoslovak courts in absentia to ten years in prison, to the forfeiture of his property and loss of all of his official titles and decorations. Czechoslovakia unsuccessfully requested the US to extradite him.

=== Life in the United States ===
In the following three decades in the United States, Šejna worked as a counterintelligence analyst for the Central Intelligence Agency later as a consultant to the Defense Intelligence Agency until his death. He died on 23 August 1997 in New York City. He spoke out in interviews and appeared before U.S. Congressional committees.

=== Facts and fiction ===
He claimed "that the Soviet intelligence agency directed terrorist training camps in Czechoslovakia in the mid-60s … the Soviet Union collaborated with North Korea in the capture of the U.S. intelligence ship Pueblo from Pacific waters in 1968 and that Cuba and Czechoslovakia worked together to establish drug-trafficking networks throughout Latin America and to infiltrate those in existence … the Soviet Union and Czechoslovakia tested drugs on U.S. prisoners of war during the Korean and Vietnam wars".

In his book We Will Bury You, Šejna gave an insight into Soviet Cold War strategies, quoting Konstantin Katushev, secretary of the Soviet Central Committee: "If we can impose on the U.S.A. the external restraints proposed in our Plan, and seriously disrupt the American economy, the working and the lower middle classes will suffer the consequences and they will turn on the society that has failed them. They will be ready for revolution."

He provided a lot of interesting facts about the Communist power system and its protagonists. However, he also fabricated some mere speculations. Along with the information he provided concerning covert Soviet strategy, he also gave the West an otherwise shrouded picture of political strife and reform in the Communist state of Czechoslovakia.

== Speculations ==
(some of them)

=== by Šejna ===
- Czechoslovaks participated in human experiments on US POWs in North Korea in the early 1950s (see also section Speculations about medical experiments on POWs in the Ludvík Souček entry)

=== by others ===
- He died "under suspicious circumstances"

While some unattributed and sensationalized sources may state that Czechoslovak detector Jan Šejna died under suspicious circumstances, there is no direct or indirect evidence to support the claim that Šejna died under suspicious circumstances.

In fact, according to official records and contemporary obituaries from sources like The Washington Post and The New York Times, Šejna died peacefully of congestive heart failure on August 23, 1997. He was 70 years old and passed away at his home in Bethesda, Maryland.

While certain crowd-sourced summaries online or sensationalized Cold War narratives occasionally mischaracterize the deaths of high-profile defectors, there is no historical or investigative evidence supporting foul play in Šejna’s death.

== See also ==
- List of Eastern Bloc defectors

== Quotes ==
- Šejna should be judged as a prototype of an opportunist and a schemer brought up by the Communist party.
  –Jan Kalous: General Šejna – An Object of Interest of the Military Counter-Intelligence (English summary)
