= 1905 in science fiction =

The year 1905 was marked, in science fiction, by the following events.

== Births and deaths ==
=== Births ===
- January 6: Eric Frank Russell, British writer (d. 1978)
- July 5: Günther Krupkat, German writer (d. 1990)

=== Deaths ===
- March 24: Jules Verne, French writer, (b. 1828)

== Literary releases ==
=== Short stories ===
- Rudyard Kipling, "With the Night Mail" (American and British magazine publication).
- (in French) Three Thousand Years Among the Microbes, short story by Mark Twain.

== See also ==
- 1905 in science
- 1904 in science fiction
- 1906 in science fiction
