= 1908 in science fiction =

The year 1908 was marked, in science fiction, by the following events.

== Births ==
- November 23 : Nelson S. Bond, American writer, (d. 2006).

== Awards ==
The main science-fiction Awards known at the present time did not exist at this time.

== Literary releases ==
=== Novels ===
- (in French) Le Docteur Lerne, sous-dieu, novel by Maurice Renard.

== Movies ==
Excursion to the Moon

== See also ==
- 1908 in science
- 1907 in science fiction
- 1909 in science fiction
