= Nabou =

1968 novel by Günther Krupkat

- First edition
- Author: Günther Krupkat
- Original title: Nabou
- Cover artist: Peter Nagengast
- Language: German
- Genre: Science fiction novel
- Publisher: Das Neue Berlin, Berlin
- Publication date: 1968
- Publication place: East Germany
- Media type: Print (Hardcover & Paperback)

Nabou is a 1968 science fiction novel by German author Günther Krupkat. Written as a sequel to his 1963 novel Als die Götter starben, Nabou narrates an expedition into the interior of the Earth. A member of a research team investigating Earth's crust is revealed to be a biorobot, or "Biomat," left by an advanced spacefaring people called the Mejuans. The encounter between the humans and the alien representative is a comparative class encounter between advanced socialist aliens and human societies in a "lower stage" of development without open class conflict. A 1989 survey ranks it as the 13th most popular East German science fiction novel.

== Bibliography ==
- Fritzsche, Sonja. Science Fiction Literature in East Germany. Oxford; New York: Lang, 2006.
- Neumann, Hans-Peter. Die grosse illustrierte Bibliographie der Science Fiction in der DDR. Berlin: Shayol, 2002.
- Steinmüller, Angela and Karlheinz. Vorgriff auf das Lichte Morgen. Passau: Erster Deutscher Fantasy Club, 1995.
