= 1900 in science fiction =

The year 1900 was marked, in science fiction, by the following events.

== Births and deaths ==
=== Births ===
- April 1 : (in French) Fernand François, French writer (d. 1991).
- May 22 : Wallace West, American writer (d. 1980).

== Awards ==
The main science-fiction Awards known at the present time did not exist at this time.

== Audiovisual outputs ==
=== Movies ===
- (in French) Coppelia : La Poupée animée, by Georges Méliès.
- Going to Bed Under Difficulties (in French : Le Déshabillage impossible), by Georges Méliès.

== See also ==
- 1900 in science
- 1901 in science fiction
