= 1907 in science fiction =

The year 1907 was marked, in science fiction, by the following events.

== Births ==
- July 7 : Robert A. Heinlein, American writer (died 1988)
- November 27 : Lyon Sprague de Camp, American writer (died 2000)

== Awards ==
The main science-fiction Awards known at the present time did not exist at this time.

== Audiovisual outputs ==
=== Movies ===
- Under the Seas (in French : Vingt mille lieues sous les mers), by Georges Méliès.

== See also ==
- 1907 in science
- 1906 in science fiction
- 1908 in science fiction
