= 1910 in science fiction =

The year 1910 was marked, in science fiction, by the following events.

== Births ==
- December 24 : Fritz Leiber, American writer (died 1992)

== Awards ==
The main science-fiction Awards known at the present time did not exist at this time.

== Literary releases ==
=== Novels ===
- La Mort de la Terre, by J.-H. Rosny aîné.
- (in French) Le Péril bleu, by Maurice Renard.
- The Secret of Wilhelm Storitz (in French : Le Secret de Wilhelm Storitz), by Jules Verne.

=== Short stories ===
- The Eternal Adam (in French : L'Éternel Adam), by Jules Verne.
- (in French) La Journée d'un journaliste américain en 2889, by Jules Verne.

== Audiovisual outputs ==
=== Movies ===
A Trip To Mars (1910) This film sees a scientist visit Mars though the use of an unnamed compound of dust like composition.

== See also ==
- 1910 in science
- 1909 in science fiction
- 1911 in science fiction
