= 1904 in science fiction =

The year 1904 was marked, in science fiction, by the following events.

== Awards ==
The main science-fiction Awards known at the present time did not exist at this time.

== Literary releases ==
=== Novels ===
- Master of the World (in French : La Maître du monde), novel by Jules Verne.

=== Movies ===
- The Impossible Voyage (in French : Le Voyage à travers l'impossible), by par Georges Méliès.

== See also ==
- 1904 in science
- 1903 in science fiction
- 1905 in science fiction
