= Radhostice =

- Municipality
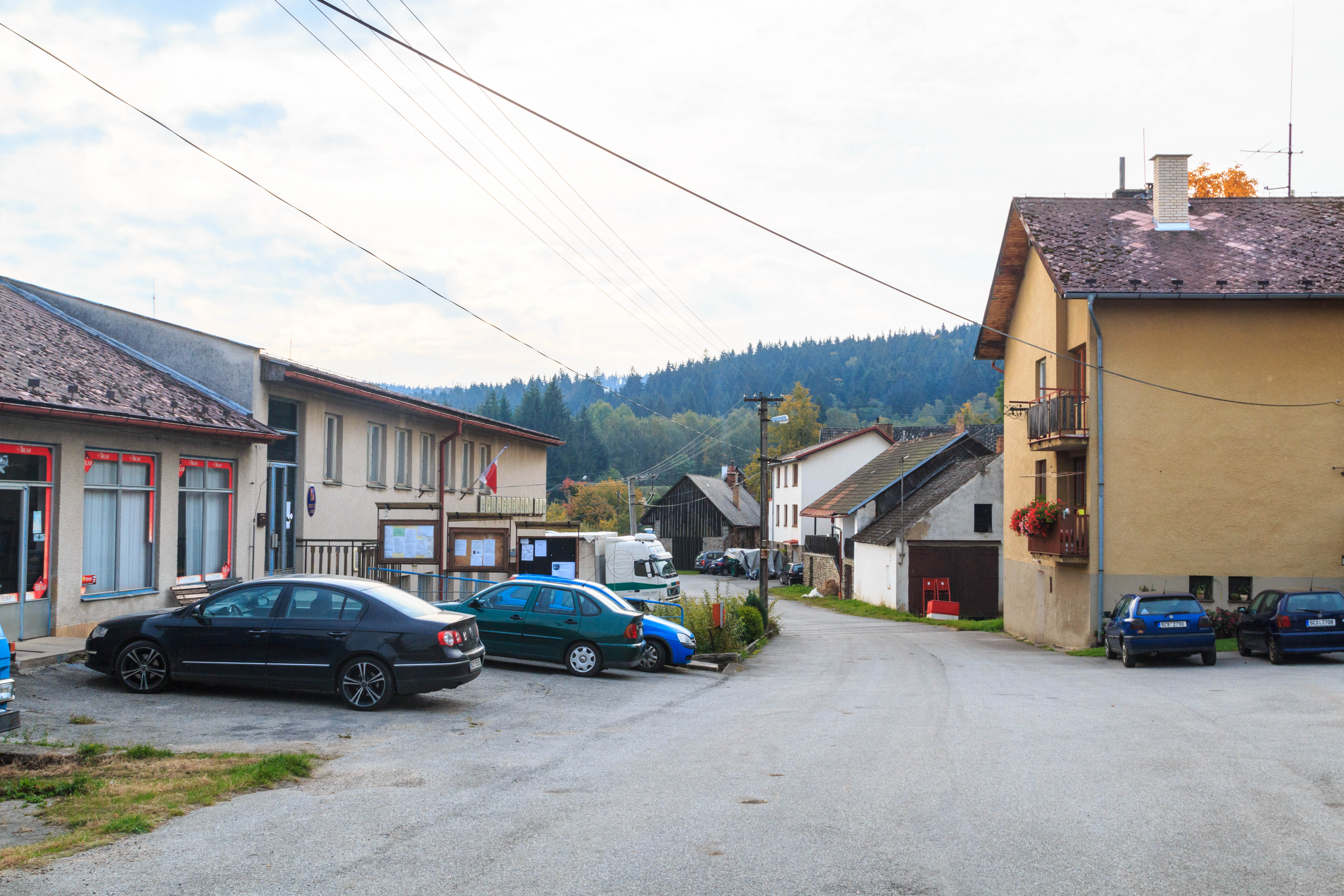
- Municipal office

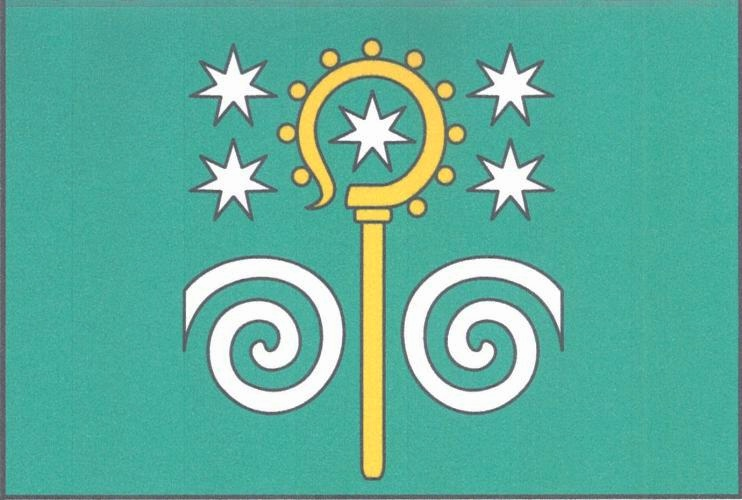
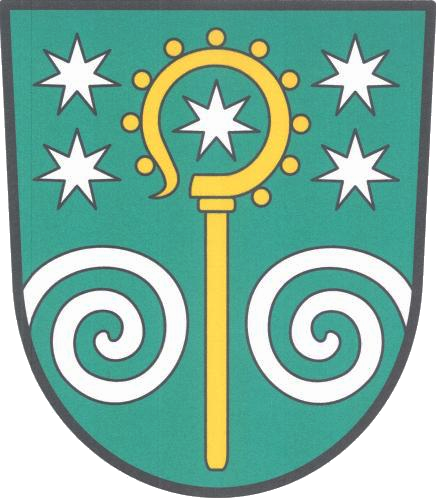
- Flag Coat of arms

- Location in the Czech Republic
- Coordinates: 49°4′46″N 13°52′50″E
- Country: Czech Republic
- Region: South Bohemian
- District: Prachatice
- First mentioned: 1315

Area
  - Total: 10.40 km^{2} (4.02 sq mi)
- Elevation: 770 m (2,530 ft)

Population (2026-01-01)
  - Total: 150
  - Density: 14/km^{2} (37/sq mi)
- Time zone: UTC+1 (CET)
  - Summer (DST): UTC+2 (CEST)
- Postal code: 384 81
- Website: www.radhostice.cz

Radhostice is a municipality and village in Prachatice District in the South Bohemian Region of the Czech Republic. It has about 200 inhabitants. The village of Libotyně within the municipality is well preserved and is protected as a village monument zone.

Radhostice lies approximately 12 kilometres (7 mi) north-west of Prachatice, 46 km (29 mi) west of České Budějovice, and 119 km (74 mi) south of Prague.

== Administrative division ==
Radhostice consists of four municipal parts (in brackets population according to the 2021 census):

- Radhostice (72)
- Dvorec (29)
- Libotyně (29)
- Lštění (23)

== Demographics ==
Historical population
Year	Pop.	±%
1869	688	—
1880	678	−1.5%
1890	645	−4.9%
1900	619	−4.0%
1910	623	+0.6%
1921	562	−9.8%
1930	541	−3.7%
1950	301	−44.4%
1961	291	−3.3%
1970	239	−17.9%
1980	209	−12.6%
1991	200	−4.3%
2001	170	−15.0%
2011	158	−7.1%
2021	153	−3.2%
Source: Censuses

== Notable people ==
- Jan Šejna (1927–1997), military leader
