= In the Days of the Comet =

1906 science fiction novel by H. G. Wells

- First US edition
- Author: H. G. Wells
- Language: English
- Genre: Science fiction
- Published: 1906
- Publisher: Macmillan & Co. (UK); The Century Company (US)
- Publication place: United Kingdom
- Media type: Print (Hardcover and Paperback)
- Pages: 378
- Text: In the Days of the Comet at Wikisource

In the Days of the Comet is a 1906 science fiction novel by H. G. Wells in which humanity is "exalted" when a comet causes "the nitrogen of the air, the old azote," to "change out of itself" and become "a respirable gas, differing indeed from oxygen, but helping and sustaining its action, a bath of strength and healing for nerve and brain." The result: "The great Change has come for evermore, happiness and beauty are our atmosphere, there is peace on earth and good will to all men."

== Plot summary ==
An unnamed narrator is the author of a prologue ("The Man Who Wrote in the Tower") and an epilogue ("The Window of the Tower"). In these short texts is depicted an encounter with a "happy, active-looking" old man: the protagonist and author of the first-person narrative, writing the story of his life immediately before and after "the Change".

This narrative is divided into three "books": Book I: The Comet; Book II: The Green Vapours; and Book III: The New World.

Book I recounts that William ("Willie") Leadford, "third in the office staff of Rawdon's pot-bank [a place where pottery is made] in Clayton," quits his job just as an economic recession caused by American dumping hits industrial Britain, and is unable to find another position. He returns to being a student and his emotional life is dominated by his attachment to Nettie Stuart, "the daughter of the head gardener of the rich Mr. Verrall's widow", of a village called Checkshill Towers. Converted to socialism by his friend 'Parload', Leadford blames class-based injustice for the squalid living conditions in which he and his mother live. The date of the action is unspecified.

When Nettie jilts Leadford for the son and heir of the Verrall family, Leadford buys a revolver, intending to kill them both and himself. As this plot matures, a comet with an "unprecedented band in the green" in its spectroscopy looms gradually larger in the sky, eventually becoming brighter than the Moon. Just as Leadford is about to kill his rivals, the green comet enters the Earth's atmosphere and disintegrates, causing a soporific green fog.

Book II opens with Leadford's awakening, in which he is acutely aware of the beauty in the world, he can think much more clearly, and his attitude toward others is one of generous fellow-feeling. The same effects occur in every human being, who accordingly re-organize human society. By chance, Leadford falls in with a Cabinet minister and briefly becomes his secretary.

Book III begins with an intense discussion by Verrall, Leadford, and Nettie, about their future. Although Nettie wants to establish a ménage à trois, Leadford and Verrall reject the idea, and Leadford devotes himself to his mother until her death. Leadford marries Anna, who has been helping care for his mother, and they have a son; but soon thereafter Nettie contacts Leadford.

In the epilogue, the 72-year-old Leadford reveals that he, Nettie, Verrall, and Anna were from then on "very close, you understand, we were friends, helpers, personal lovers in a world of lovers". The author is troubled "by my uneasy sense of profound moral differences."

== Characters ==
=== William "Willie" Leadford ===
At the beginning of the novel William Leadford is an angry, confident young man with an intellectual bent. Looking back fifty years later, he calls himself "ill clothed, ill fed, ill housed, ill educated and ill trained." His age is unclear: he is described both as 21 years of age and 17 or 18. He is a member of the British working class and, like H. G. Wells, a believer in socialism.

Leadford has been Nettie Stuart's "sweetheart" for more than three years. He works in a "pot-bank," has studied shorthand, and is a religious sceptic. He lives in lodgings with his timid, work-worn, but loving mother, widowed by a train accident, who believes in "a quaint old-fashioned narrow faith."

=== Nettie Stuart ===
Nettie, the beautiful daughter of a gardener, has known William Leadford since they were children because their mothers were "second cousins and old schoolfellows."

=== Edward Verrall ===
The Verralls are a wealthy upper-class family. Mrs. Verrall is a widow. Edward Verrall is "a gallant youngster, people said, and very clever. Young as he was there was talk of parliament for him; he had been a great success at the university."

=== Parload ===
Leadford's only close friend is a fellow clerk and socialist. But the pair quarrel and Leadford breaks off relations when Parload avers that socialism is "only a theory," whereas science is "something more". In later years Parload becomes a great scientist whose "work upon intersecting radiations has broadened the intellectual horizon of mankind for ever."

== Reception ==
Wells's open endorsement of polyamorous love at the end of In the Days of the Comet caused some scandal. Various organisations dedicated to preserving public morals, including the YWCA, Salvation Army and 'Anti-Vice and White Slavery' campaigners, spoke out against the book, as did several influential reviewers: 'socialistic men's wives, we gather,’ said the Times Literary Supplement, 'are, no less than their goods, to be held in common.' The affair also damaged Wells's standing in the Fabians. On 18 October 1906, Beatrice Webb wrote in her diary: "In the Days of the Comet ends with a glowing anticipation of promiscuity in sexual relationships ... [but] Wells is, I believe, merely gambling with the idea of free love—throwing it out to see what sort of reception it gets—without responsibility for its effect on the character of the hearers. It is this recklessness that makes Sidney dislike him."

== See also ==
- 1906 in science fiction
