= 1902 in science fiction =

The year 1902 was marked, in science fiction, by the following events.

== Births ==
- April 4 : Stanley G. Weinbaum, American writer (died 1935)
- August 10 : Curt Siodmak, American writer (died 2000)

== Awards ==
The main science-fiction Awards known at the present time did not exist at this time.

=== Movies ===
- A Trip to the Moon (in French : Le Voyage dans la Lune), a silent film by Georges Méliès.

== See also ==
- 1902 in science
- 1901 in science fiction
- 1903 in science fiction
