= 1901 in science fiction =

The year 1901 was marked, in science fiction, by the following events.

== Births and deaths ==
=== Births ===
- April 27 : Frank Belknap Long, American writer (died 1994)
- October 18 : (in French) Paul Alfred Müller, German writer (died 1970)

== Awards ==
The main science-fiction Awards known at the present time did not exist at this time.

== Literary releases ==
=== Novels ===
- The First Men in the Moon, novel by H. G. Wells.

=== Short stories ===
- The New Accelerator, short story by H. G. Wells.

== Audiovisual outputs ==
=== Movies ===
- An Over-Incubated Baby by Walter R. Booth.

== See also ==
- 1901 in science
- 1900 in science fiction
- 1902 in science fiction
