= Going to Bed Under Difficulties =

- Directed by: Georges Méliès
- Release date: 1900
- Running time: 1 min, 30 secs
- Country: France
- Language: Silent

Le Déshabillage impossible, released in the United States as Going to Bed Under Difficulties and in the United Kingdom as An Increasing Wardrobe, is a 1900 French short silent comedy trick film, directed by Georges Méliès. In the film, a man attempts to undress so he can go to sleep.

== Plot ==
Going to Bed Under Difficulties (1900)

A man in a hotel room wants to sleep for the night. He takes off his suit (placing it on a clothing rack) and his trousers (placing them on a chair), but then finds himself wearing a coat and hat that have appeared magically. The man removes them, but a new hat and a plaid pair of trousers appear in their places. He removes these clothes as well; this process repeats, with the man undoing each addition of clothing with more and more agitation.

The end of the film is lost; according to a contemporary catalogue description, the man's attempt to undress ends with him rolling about on the floor and on the bed, and finally collapsing in an epileptic seizure.

== Production and release ==
Méliès plays the man in the film. An editing effect called the substitution splice was used for the magically appearing clothes. An American catalogue mentions that the end of the film also uses fast motion photography as a special effect; if so, it is the only known Méliès film to do so. (It is difficult to verify whether fast motion was used at the end, since the last few seconds appear to be missing from the surviving print.)

The film was released by Méliès's Star Film Company and numbered 312–313 in its catalogues.

== Historical significance ==
Going to Bed Under Difficulties marks the second use of the sight gag by Méliès in which a character, trying to undress, is foiled by magically appearing clothes; the first being Up-To-Date Spiritualism (1900). The gag was frequently recycled by rival studios over the following few years in a series of close imitations of the Méliès film, with titles such as Undressing Impossible (1901), Clothes Enchanted (1901), Undressing Extraordinary (1901), and The Inexhaustible Wardrobe (1902).

The broader concept on which the film is founded, that of clothes on revolt, had previously appeared in Méliès's film The Bewitched Inn. The film historian Paolo Cherchi Usai notes that the film evokes the concept of a split personality, a constantly recurring theme in Méliès's work:

Méliès, constantly torn between unabashed playfulness and sheer perfectionism, was obsessed by the idea of multiple identity. He was so aware of his multiplicitous personality that he staged a revealing and somehow disturbing parody of himself in Going to Bed under Difficulties (1900), in which he tries to undress and sleep while different clothes in various styles systematically appear, at increasing speed, upon his body.

== See also ==
- 1900 in science fiction
