= 1935 in science fiction =

The year 1935 was marked, in science fiction, by the following events.

== Births and deaths ==
=== Births ===
- January 15 : Robert Silverberg, American writer.
- June 25 : Charles Sheffield, British writer (died 2002)

=== Deaths ===
- December 14 : Stanley Weinbaum, American writer (born 1902)

== Literary releases ==
=== Novels ===
- It Can't Happen Here, by Sinclair Lewis.
- Quinzinzinzili, by Régis Messac.

== Movies ==
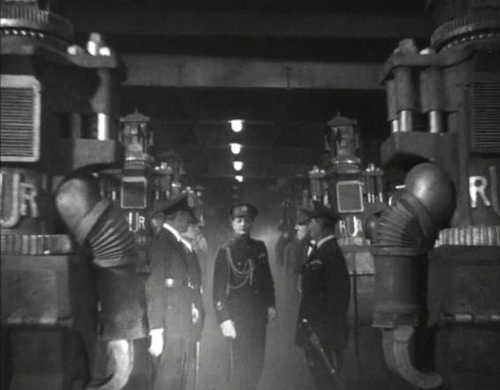
Robots in Loss of Sensation

- Bride of Frankenstein, by James Whale.
- Loss of Sensation, by Alexandr Andriyevsky.

== Awards ==
The main science-fiction Awards known at the present time did not exist at this time.

== See also ==
- 1935 in science
