= 1903 in science fiction =

The year 1903 was marked, in science fiction, by the following events.

== Births ==
- January 3 : (in French) René Brantonne, French illustrator and cartoonist (died 1979)
- May 21 : Manly Wade Wellman, American writer (died 1986)
- June 25 : George Orwell, British writer and journalist (died 1950)
- July 10 : John Wyndham, British writer (died 1969)

== Awards ==
The main science-fiction Awards known at the present time did not exist at this time.

== Literary releases ==
=== Novels ===
- Force ennemie, French novel by John Antoine Nau.

=== Short stories ===
Publication of The Land Ironclads by H.G. Wells. A pre-vision of military tanks, including their use in overrunning positions defended by infantry. The land ironclads used feet rather than caterpillar tracks to traverse irregular terrain. The story is narrated by a war correspondent.

== See also ==
- 1903 in science
- 1902 in science fiction
- 1904 in science fiction
