= Master of the World (novel) =

1904 novel by Jules Verne

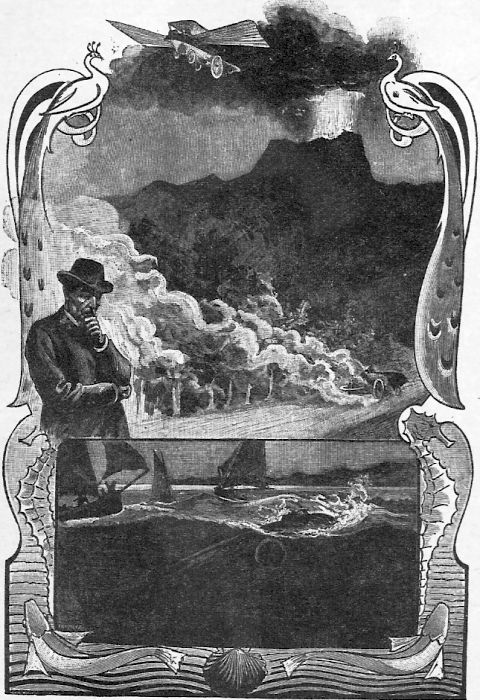
- Illustration from the original publication. Drawing by Georges Roux.
- Author: Jules Verne
- Original title: Maître du monde
- Cover artist: Georges Roux
- Language: French
- Series: The Extraordinary Voyages #53; Robur the Conqueror #2
- Genre: Science fiction, adventure novel
- Publisher: Pierre-Jules Hetzel
- Publication date: 1904
- Publication place: France
- English publication date: 1911
- Media type: Print (hardback)
- Pages: 317pp
- Preceded by: A Drama in Livonia
- Followed by: Invasion of the Sea

Master of the World (French: Maître du monde), published in 1904, is one of the last novels by French pioneer science fiction writer, Jules Verne. At the time Verne wrote the novel, his health was failing. Master of the World is a "black novel," filled with foreboding and fear of the rise of tyrants such as the novel's villain, Robur, and totalitarianism. It is a sequel to his 1886 novel Robur the Conqueror.

Master of the World contains a number of scientific ideas, current to Verne's time, which are now widely known to be errors. For example, traveling at high speed does not reduce a vehicle's weight.

== Plot outline ==
Set in the summer of 1903, a series of unexplained events occur across the Eastern United States, caused by objects moving with such great speed that they are nearly invisible. The first-person narrator, John Strock, 'Head inspector in the federal police department' in Washington, D.C., travels to the Blue Ridge Mountains of North Carolina to investigate. He discovers that all the phenomena are being caused by Robur, a brilliant inventor. (He was previously featured as a character in Verne's Robur the Conqueror.)

Robur has perfected a new machine, which he has dubbed the Terror. It is a 10-metre (33 ft) long vehicle, capable of operating as a speedboat, submarine, automobile, or aircraft. It can travel at the (then) unheard of speed of 150 miles per hour (240 km/h) on land and at more than 200 miles per hour (320 km/h) when flying.

Strock tries to capture the Terror but instead is captured himself. Robur drives the strange craft to elude his pursuers, heading to the Caribbean and into a thunderstorm. The Terror is struck by lightning, breaks apart, and falls into the ocean. Strock is rescued from the vehicle's wreckage, but Robur's body is never found. The reader is left to decide whether or not he has died.

== Allusions/references ==
The novel's events take place in the summer of 1903, as characters refer to events of the 1902 Mount Pelée eruption on Martinique. Verne took a few liberties with American geography in the novel. It is set in Morganton, North Carolina and refers to a mountain known as the Great Eyrie. The name suggests Mount Airy, located elsewhere in North Carolina; its description as flat-topped is similar to the mountain nearby known as Table Rock. Another portion of the novel is described as taking place at a large deep natural lake in Kansas, but no such lake exists.

== Adaptations ==
- The film Master of the World (1961) starred Vincent Price and Charles Bronson. The scriptwriter Richard Matheson combined elements of this book and its predecessor in the screenplay, as well as adding others of his own.
- An hour long TV cartoon special by the same name was produced in 1976. The cartoon combines elements of Robur's backstory at the Wellington Institute and also depicts Robur as a ruthless terrorist who attempts to destroy Washington DC with a powerful bomb. His ship then crashes into the Potomac River after being struck by lightning.
- Robur is featured as a character in Kim Newman's alternate history novel, The Bloody Red Baron (1995), serving as the chief airship engineer of the Central Powers. The chapter featuring him and his airship is entitled "Master of the World."
- The Terror appears in the game Pirates of the Mysterious Islands.
- Robur and his first mate Tom Turner are featured as central characters in T.E. MacArthur's steampunk novels, The Volcano Lady: Volume One and Volume Two. The "Terror" is suggested as part of the tie-in with Verne's original novels Robur the Conqueror and Master of the World.
- Robur the Conqueror and Master of the World were both adapted in the Classics Illustrated series of comic books ca. 1961. They were Issues #162 and #163 in that series respectively. Artist Gray Morrow drew #163.

== See also ==
- 1904 in science fiction
- List of underwater science fiction works
