= 1906 in science fiction =

The year 1906 was marked, in science fiction, by the following events.

== Births and deaths ==
=== Births ===
- birthday unknown : Mark Clifton, American writer (died 1963)
- October 29 : Fredric Brown, American writer (died 1972)

== Awards ==
The main science-fiction Awards known at the present time did not exist at this time.

== Literary releases ==
=== Novels ===
- In the Days of the Comet, novel by H. G. Wells.

== Audiovisual outputs ==
=== Movies ===
- The '?' Motorist by Walter R. Booth.
- (in French) Travel around a Star by Gaston Velle.

== See also ==
- 1906 in science
- 1905 in science fiction
- 1907 in science fiction
