= Günther Krupkat =

German fiction writer

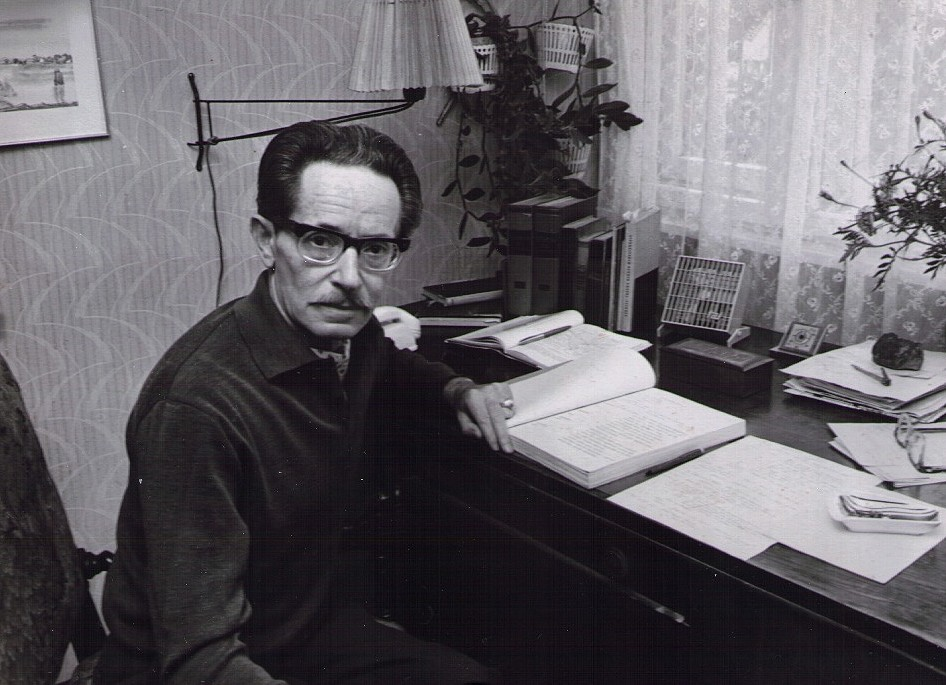
- Born: 5 July 1905; Berlin
- Died: 14 April 1990 (aged 84); Berlin
- Occupation: author
- Writing career
- Language: German
- Genre: Science fiction

Günther Krupkat (5 July 1905 in Berlin – 14 April 1990 in Berlin) was a German fiction writer, known as one of the leading science fiction writers of East Germany.

== Biography ==
Born in Berlin in 1905, Krupkat studied engineering before dropping out for lack of means to support himself. He wrote his first novel, Od, at age 19, having been inspired by Soviet writer Aleksey Nikolayevich Tolstoy's 1923 novel Aelita. Its publication in pre-war Germany was rejected due to the leftist ideas propounded by Krupkat.

Active in the Communist Resistance against the Third Reich, Krupkat fled to Czechoslovakia at the close of the Second World War. He settled in the German Democratic Republic (East Germany) after the Nazis' defeat, writing science fiction stories, screenplays, and novels, first fully devoting himself to a writer's career in the mid-1950s, following a decade of working as an editor.

Krupkat became chairman of the East German Writers Union's Science Fiction Working Group upon its formation in 1972. He was succeeded by Heiner Rank in 1978.

== Works ==
Novels

- 1957: Das Schiff der Verlorenen
- 1958: Das Gesicht
- 1960: Die große Grenze
- 1963: Als die Götter starben
- 1968: Nabou

Stories

- 1956: Gefangene des ewigen Kreises
- 1956: Die Unsichtbaren
- 1957: Kobalt 60
- 1957: Nordlicht über Palmen
- 1969: Insel der Angst
- 1974: Das Duell
- 1975: Bazillus phantastikus
- 1975: Der Mann vom Anti

== Bibliography ==
- Fritzsche, Sonja. Science Fiction Literature in East Germany. Oxford; New York: Lang, 2006.
- Neumann, Hans-Peter. Die grosse illustrierte Bibliographie der Science Fiction in der DDR. Berlin: Shayol, 2002.
- Steinmüller, Angela and Karlheinz. Vorgriff auf das Lichte Morgen. Passau: Erster Deutscher Fantasy Club, 1995.
