= 1909 in science fiction =

The year 1909 was marked, in science fiction, by the following events.

== Births ==
- February 25 : Edgar Pangborn, American writer (died 1976)

== Awards ==
The main science-fiction Awards known at the present time did not exist at this time.

== Literary releases ==
=== Novels ===
- (in French) Sternentau. Die Pflanze vom Neptunmond, novel by Kurd Laßwitz.

=== Short stories ===
- The Machine Stops, short story by Edward Morgan Forster.

== See also ==
- 1909 in science
- 1908 in science fiction
- 1910 in science fiction
