= The Eternal Adam =

1910 short story by Jules and Michel Verne

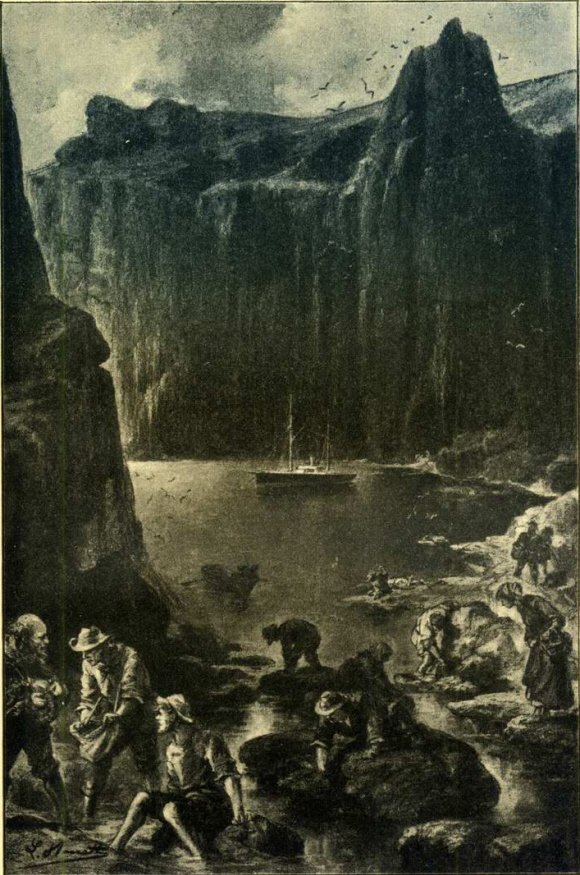
Illustration by Léon Bennett

The Eternal Adam (French: L'Éternel Adam) is a short novelette by Michel Verne recounting the progressive fall of a group of survivors into barbarism following an apocalypse. Although the story was drafted by his father Jules Verne in the last years of his life, it was greatly expanded by Michel Verne.

== Plot summary ==
The story is set in a far future in which Zartog Sofr-Aï-Sran, an archaeologist, deciphers the preserved journal of a survivor to the total destruction of civilisation. The discovery comes in the midst of philosophical controversies on the origin of humans, between those that believe in the existence of a unique ancestor and those that do not.

The journal describes the struggle for survival of a small group of French men and women after a sudden and unexplained catastrophe destroys the European continent, and the futility of the accumulated knowledge in the group. After seeing that their illiterate offspring will have no immediate use for the scientific knowledge they possess, the journal's author and his friends try to write down everything they remembered and store it in time-capsules for future generations, but those capsules perished in the subsequent centuries.

The conclusion of the novel implies that the unique ancestor is the survivor whose journal was discovered, and that civilisation is doomed to eternal fall and rebirth. The "eternal Adam" is the myth of Adam and Eve, a variation of which is present in Zartog's civilization and he speculates may be the only knowledge that survived from countless previous cataclysms, and the only thing that may carry on after his civilization inevitably falls.

== See also ==
- 1910 in science fiction
- Shaggy God story, a name for the genre in which the characters end up being Adam and Eve.
