= 1990 in science fiction =

The year 1990 was marked, in science fiction, by the following:

== Events ==
- The 48th annual Worldcon, ConFiction, was held in The Hague, Netherlands

== Births and deaths ==
=== Births ===
- Rie Qudan

=== Deaths ===
- Ed Emshwiller
- Donald A. Wollheim

== Literary releases ==
=== Novels ===
- Jurassic Park, by Michael Crichton

=== Short stories ===
- "Bears Discover Fire" by Terry Bisson

=== Comics ===
- Battle Angel Alita begins serialization in Business Jump magazine
- Hard Boiled, by Frank Miller and Geof Darrow
- Martha Washington, by Frank Miller and Dave Gibbons
- The Men in Black, by Lowell Cunningham and Sandy Carruthers

=== Other books ===
- Expedition by Wayne Barlowe
- Man After Man by Dougal Dixon

== Movies ==
- Total Recall, dir. by Paul Verhoeven
- Tremors, dir. by Ron Underwood

== Video games ==
- Wing Commander, by Chris Roberts

== Awards ==
=== Hugos ===
- Best novel: Hyperion, by Dan Simmons
- Best novella: The Mountains of Mourning, by Lois McMaster Bujold
- Best novelette: "Enter a Soldier. Later: Enter Another" by Robert Silverberg
- Best short story: " Boobs" by Suzy McKee Charnas
- Best related work: The World Beyond the Hill, by Alexei Panshin and Cory Panshin
- Best dramatic presentation: Indiana Jones and the Last Crusade, dir. by Steven Spielberg; Screenplay by Jeffrey Boam; Story by George Lucas and Menno Meyjes; based on characters created by George Lucas and Philip Kaufman
- Best professional editor: Gardner Dozois
- Best professional artist: Don Maitz
- Best original artwork: Cover of Rimrunners, by Don Maitz
- Best Semiprozine: Locus, ed. by Charles N. Brown
- Best fanzine: The Mad 3 Party, ed. by Leslie Turek
- Best fan writer: Dave Langford
- Best fan artist: Stu Shiffman

=== Nebulas ===
- Best novel: Tehanu: The Last Book of Earthsea, by Ursula K. LeGuin
- Best novella: The Hemingway Hoax by Joe Haldeman
- Best novelette: " Tower of Babylon" by Ted Chiang
- Best short story: "Bears Discover Fire" by Terry Bisson

=== Other awards ===
- BSFA Award for Best Novel: Take Back Plenty by Colin Greenwood
- Locus Award for Best Science Fiction Novel: Hyperion by Dan Simmons
- Saturn Award for Best Science Fiction Film: Total Recall
