= The Secret of Wilhelm Storitz =

1910 novel by Jules Verne

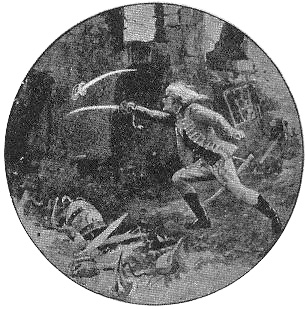
- Haralan fighting an invisible Wilhelm Storitz
- Author: Jules Verne
- Original title: Le Secret de Wilhelm Storitz
- Translator: Peter Schulman
- Illustrator: George Roux
- Language: French
- Genre: Fantasy novel
- Publisher: Louis-Jules Hetzel
- Publication date: 1910
- Publication place: France
- English publication date: 2011

The Secret of Wilhelm Storitz (French: Le Secret de Wilhelm Storitz) is a fantasy novel by Jules Verne, published by Louis-Jules Hetzel in 1910. The manuscript was written around 1897. It was the last one Verne sent to Hetzel.

== Plot ==
Railway engineer Henri Vidal was invited by his younger brother Marc to pay him a visit in the (fictional) city of Ragz, Hungary. Marc was engaged to Myra Roderich, the daughter of highly praised Dr. Roderich. Before leaving Paris, he learned that a man named Wilhelm Storitz had proposed to Myra, but he was refused.

Henri describes his journey, made on land and on the Danube River on the barge Dorothée, also noting monuments and cities he sees on the way. At his arrival in Ragz, he received a warm welcome from Myra's family.

One day, Dr. Roderich told Henri and Haralan (Myra's brother) that Wilhelm Storitz had come to request to propose again to Myra. When he is again refused, he threatened the family.

Before the marriage, a contract must be signed by the town governor as an old tradition from Ragz. A party was organized for the event, which was disrupted by a mysterious voice that sang the German Hate Song. To make matters worse, the contract was found torn to pieces and the bride's wreath lifted itself and hovered mysteriously in the air, ensuing panic among the people at the party.

After reporting the events to the chief of the Ragz police, Heinrich Stepark, he suspected that the culprit must be Wilhelm Storitz, as he was the only person who profoundly disrespected the Roderichs. Wilhelm's house was searched but, beside Myra's bridal wreath and a mysterious yellow fluid in a blue vial, no significant evidence was found.

A few days later, after getting the permission from the governor, Myra Roderich and Marc Vidal were ready to be wed the next day at the Ragz cathedral. On June 1, seconds before being wed, the same voice mentioned above cursed the couple. Myra lost consciousness and was given special care.

By now the entire population of the town suspected Wilhelm Storitz to be the culprit. As a consequence, the mob burned his house down, despite the efforts made by police agents.

Later, while on a walk, Henri and Stepark overheard a conversation between Wilhelm and his servant Hermann, both in a state of invisibility, as they had been throughout the novel's plot. Stepark attempted to capture Wilhelm but failed. When they returned, they found Myra missing.

The next day, using the information gathered from the conversation, Haralan fought with an invisible Wilhelm and defeated him. As he bled, Wilhelm became visible.

Hermann agreed to become visible and to be imprisoned. He was interrogated about the location of Myra and about the mysterious substance, but he was unable to answer as Storitz had never told him about his plans. When the guards entered his cell in order to release him, he was found dead of embolism.

Back home they were surprised to find Myra, who had not left her bed at all - she was merely invisible. As Wilhelm had died, and the antidote had been destroyed, Myra was to remain invisible forever. In Paris, Henri had the idea that Storitz became visible because he bled and the same thing could be achieved for Myra through a surgery. However, he was soon informed that she was pregnant, so she could not undergo the surgery. Miraculously, Myra became visible after giving birth to her son and they moved to Paris, where Marc continued his job as a painter.

== Characters ==
=== Vidal ===
- Henri Vidal, 33, railway engineer
- Marc Vidal, 28, painter

=== Roderich ===
- Myra Roderich, 20, fiancée (later wife) of Marc Vidal
- Haralan Roderich, 28, Myra's brother, captain of l'Infanterie des Confins Militaires (Infantry of the Military Frontier)
- Dr. Roderich, 50, Myra's father
- Ms. Roderich, 45, Myra's mother

=== Storitz ===
- Wilhelm Storitz, 35, son of Otto Storitz, main antagonist
- Otto Storitz, deceased, great alchemist

=== Other ===
- Heinrich Stepark, chief of police in Ragz
- Hermann, Wilhelm Storitz's servant
- The Governor of Ragz
- Lieutenant Armgard
- Judge Neumann

== New edition ==
In 2011, Bison Books brought out a new edition, the first to be based on Verne's manuscript. Earlier editions feature a version of the novel heavily rewritten by Jules Verne's son Michel, who improbably pushed the date of the story back to the 18th century, despite many references to 19th century discoveries, such as Roentgen rays.

== See also ==
- The Invisible Man

== See also ==
- 1910 in science fiction
