= Als die Götter starben =

1963 novel by Günther Krupkat

When the Gods Died
- First edition
- Author: Günther Krupkat
- Original title: Als die Götter starben
- Cover artist: Martin Kotsch
- Language: German
- Genre: Science fiction novel
- Publisher: Das Neue Berlin, Berlin
- Publication date: 1982
- Publication place: East Germany
- Media type: Print (Hardcover & Paperback)

Als die Götter starben (When the Gods Died) is a 1963 science fiction novel by German author Günther Krupkat about contact between humans and an alien race from the distant planet "Meju." After the discovery of alien diaries on the Martian moon Phobos in the 21st century, a frame narrative tells the interconnected stories of human power struggles in ancient Mesopotamia and alien flight from a distant planet following a cataclysm. A 1989 poll ranked it as the seventh most popular East German science fiction novel.

== Bibliography ==
- Fritzsche, Sonja. Science Fiction Literature in East Germany. Oxford; New York: Lang, 2006.
- Neumann, Hans-Peter. Die grosse illustrierte Bibliographie der Science Fiction in der DDR. Berlin: Shayol, 2002.
- Steinmüller, Angela and Karlheinz. Vorgriff auf das Lichte Morgen. Passau: Erster Deutscher Fantasy Club, 1995.
