= 2006 in science fiction =

The year 2006 was marked, in science fiction, by the following:

== Events ==
- The 64th annual Worldcon, L.A. con IV, was held in Anaheim, USA

== Births and deaths ==
=== Deaths ===
- Octavia E. Butler
- Pascual Enguídanos
- Stanislaw Lem

== Literary releases ==
=== Novels ===
- Next, by Michael Crichton
- Rainbows End, by Vernor Vinge
- The Road, by Cormac McCarthy

== Movies ==
- Children of Men, dir. by Alfonso Cuarón
- The Host, dir. by Bong Joon Ho
- Idiocracy, dir. by Mike Judge
- Paprika, dir. by Satoshi Kon
- Primer, dir. by Shane Carruth
- A Scanner Darkly, dir. by Richard Linklater

== Television ==
- Eureka
- Jericho

== Video games ==
- Gears of War
- Lost Planet: Extreme Conditions

== Awards ==
=== Hugos ===
- Best novel: Spin, by Robert Charles Wilson
- Best novella: Inside Job, by Connie Willis
- Best novelette: " Two Hearts", by Peter S. Beagle
- Best short story: "Tk'tk'tk", by David D. Levine
- Best related work: Storyteller: Writing Lessons & More from 27 Years of the Clarion Writers' Workshop, by Kate Wilhelm
- Best dramatic presentation, long form: Serenity, written and dir. by Joss Whedon
- Best dramatic presentation, short form: Doctor Who — "The Empty Child"/"The Doctor Dances"; dir. by James Hawes; written by Steven Moffatt
- Best professional editor: David G. Hartwell
- Best professional artist: Donato Giancola
- Best Semiprozine: Locus, ed. by Charles N. Brown, Kirsten Gong-Wong and Liza Groen Trombi
- Best fanzine: Plokta, ed. by Alison Scott, Steve Davies and Mike Scott
- Best fan writer: Dave Langford
- Best fan artist: Frank Wu

=== Nebulas ===
- Best novel: Seeker, by Jack McDevitt
- Best novella: Burn, by James Patrick Kelly
- Best novelette: "Two Hearts" by Peter S. Beagle
- Best short story: "Echo" by Elizabeth Hand

=== Other awards ===
- BSFA Award for Best Novel: End of the World Blues, by Jon Courtenay Grimwood
- Locus Award for Best Science Fiction Novel: Accelerando, by Charles Stross
- Saturn Award for Best Science Fiction Film: Children of Men
