= Ludvík Souček =

Czech writer

Ludvík Souček (17 May 1926 – 26 December 1978) was a Czech science fiction writer.

== Biography ==
Born at Prague, he graduated at Medical faculty of Charles University in Prague as a dentist in 1951 and started his professional life at the dental clinic as an assistant. Later, he joined the military (1954) and became an officer. He spent two years (1954–1955) in Korea as a member of the Czechoslovak military mission in Korea (1952–1956) after Korean War. Next, he was employed as a dentist in the Central Military Hospital in Prague (1955–1964), then served at Czechoslovak Ministry of National Defence (1964–1968). He shortly worked at the Central Committee KSČ (Communist Party of Czechoslovakia) (1968). The same year he was employed in the military redaction of the Czechoslovak Television as an editor (1969–1971) and later in the Albatros publishing house (1971–1976). Because of serious disease, he went into disability pension in 1976.

He was a member of KSČ (Communist Party of Czechoslovakia) all his life, and the ideology definitely profoundly influenced his literary work. In spite of his deep communist persuasion, Souček arguably remains the most popular and most widely known author of Czech Science fiction.

Non-fiction is one of the most important elements in Souček's writings. Souček is actually best known as the "Czech Erich von Däniken". His books of "Portents" (Tušení souvislosti, 1974, Tušení stínu, 1978) are collections of Däniken-styled non-fiction essays on striking, surprising, obscured, or otherwise "not-yet" explained facts from the history of mankind, which are indeed hard to impossible to explain either given the present day scientific knowledge or our assumptions on the scientific knowledge or technology level of ancient civilizations. Similarly to his forerunner Däniken, Souček hinted that cultural and architecture phenomena (such as megaliths of Baalbek) some natural catastrophes (such as Tunguska event), mythologies and biblical histories (such as the destruction of Sodom and Gomorrah) can be best explained through an alien, extraterrestrial intervention. Unlike his predecessor, Souček does not push the idea of an alien intervention too hard, he gives ample space to alternative explanations and never actually states that it must have been "them". Souček's essays also have rather high scientific standard and contain good discussion of relevant published sources.

Science fiction trilogy of "Blind Birds" (Cesta slepých ptáků 1964, Runa rider 1967, Sluneční jezero 1968) contains a very strong non-fiction element and it should be seen as continuation of the best Czech Science fiction tradition. Souček's "Blind Birds" actually mimic the method and composition of "War with the Newts, 1937" (translation of Válka s mloky, 1936) by Karel Čapek. Both Čapek and Souček initiate their plot deeply rooted in the present day setting (Čapek 30s, Souček 1960s) and both of them keenly criticize the present day social and political reality. Souček builds a virtuous mixture of scientific fact and made up archeological discoveries in France, Iceland, Brazil, and Mars. Both Čapek and Souček develop the fantastic element only very slowly, starting with the very sober 1st book, accelerating in the 2nd, and culminating in the 3rd book as hard SF par excellence: The victory of Newts and near extinction of human race, Čapek; International (both western and communist powers collaborate) discovery and rescue mission to Mars, Souček.

== Selected bibliography ==
- 1951 Hrajeme maňáskové divadlo (about puppet theater)
- 1962 Hrátky kolem křižovatky (for children)
- 1963 Jak se světlo naučilo kreslit (about photography)
- 1964 Cesta slepých ptáků (SF, further ed. 1976, 1989 and 1999)
- 1965 Krotitelé ďáblů (adventure)
- 1965 Co oko nevidí (about photography)
- 1966 Cesta k moderní fotografii (about photography)
- 1967 Cesta slepých ptáků II. Runa rider (SF, further ed. 1976 and 1999)
- 1968 Cesta slepých ptáků III. Sluneční jezero (SF, further ed. 1976 and 1999)
- 1968 Případ ztraceného suchoplavce (ft. Martin Anděl, detective)
- 1969 Bratři Černé planety (SF short stories)
- 1970 Operace "Kili" (SF short stories; part of the distribution banned)
- 1970 Záhada S M (a theater play)
- 1970 Případ Jantarové komnaty (SF, ft. Martin Anděl, detective, further ed. 1990)
- 1971 Fotografujeme na cestách (about photography)
- 1972 Případ baskervillského psa (SF, ft. Martin Anděl, detective)
- 1972 Pevnost bílých mravenců (SF)
- 1973 Zájem Galaxie (SF short stories)
- 1974 Blázniví vynálezci (about "crazy inventors")
- 1974 Tušení stínu
- 1975 Co zavinil Gutenberg (about book printing)
- 1976 Rakve útočí (about the armored ships CSS Virginia, USS Merrimack and USS Monitor in the American Civil War)
- 1978 Tušení souvislosti
- 1980 Blázni z Hepteridy (SF, further ed. in 1986 and 2000)
- 1983 Bohové Atlantidy (SF, further ed. v roce 2000; English translation - Gods of Atlantis 2024)
- 1985 Hippokratův slib (SF short stories, further ed. 1997)
