= List of works published posthumously =

The following is a list of works that were published posthumously.

An asterisk indicates the author is listed in multiple subsections. (For example, Philip Sidney appears in four.)

== Literature ==
=== Novels and short stories ===
- Douglas Adams* — The Salmon of Doubt (an incomplete novel, but also essays)
- James Agee — A Death in the Family (initial publication assembled by David McDowell; alternate assembly later published by Michael Lofaro)
- Shmuel Yosef Agnon — Shira
- Louisa May Alcott — A Long Fatal Love Chase
- Horatio Alger — over thirty-five short novels after his death in 1899
- Isaac Asimov — Forward the Foundation
- Jane Austen — Northanger Abbey, Persuasion, Sanditon, and Lady Susan
- William Baldwin — Beware the Cat
- L. Frank Baum — The Magic of Oz and Glinda of Oz
- John Bellairs — The Ghost in the Mirror, The Vengeance of the Witch-finder, The Drum, the Doll, and the Zombie and The Doom of the Haunted Opera (all with Brad Strickland)
- Cyrano de Bergerac — The Other World: The States and Empires of the Moon and The States and Empires of the Sun
- Enid Blyton — Any Time Tales, The Dog with the Long Tail, and other stories, More Wishing-Chair Stories, The Young Adventurers
- Marlon Brando and Donald Cammell — Fan Tan (with David Thomson)
- Roberto Bolaño — 2666, A Little Lumpen Novelita, The Secret of Evil, The Third Reich, and Woes of the True Policeman
- Richard Brautigan — An Unfortunate Woman: A Journey
- Charlotte Brontë — The Professor
- Charles Bukowski* — over twenty books of poetry and short stories after his death in 1994
- Mikhail Bulgakov — The Master and Margarita
- Edgar Rice Burroughs — John Carter of Mars, Tarzan and the Tarzan Twins, Tarzan and the Madman, Tarzan and the Castaways, Tarzan: The Lost Adventure, Savage Pellucidar, The Wizard of Venus, I am a Barbarian, Minidoka: 937th Earl of One Mile Series M, Pirate Blood, Forgotten Tales of Love and Murder, Brother Men
- William S. Burroughs and Jack Kerouac — And the Hippos Were Boiled in Their Tanks
- Octavia E. Butler — Seed to Harvest
- Samuel Butler — The Way of All Flesh
- Albert Camus* — A Happy Death, The First Man
- Xueqin Cao (trad.) — Dream of the Red Chamber
- Angela Carter* — American Ghosts and Old World Wonders, Burning Your Boats (including six previously unpublished short stories)
- Raymond Chandler — Poodle Springs (with Robert B. Parker)
- Bruce Chatwin* — Anatomy of Restlessness (a collection of short stories and travel tales, as well as essays and articles)
- Geoffrey Chaucer* — The Canterbury Tales
- Agatha Christie* — Sleeping Murder and notebooks
- Tom Clancy — Command Authority (with Mark Greaney)
- Wilkie Collins — Blind Love (with Walter Besant)
- Joseph Conrad — Suspense: A Napoleonic Novel
- Robert Cormier — The Rag and Bone Shop
- Hannah Crafts — The Bondwoman's Narrative
- Stephen Crane — The O'Ruddy (with Robert Barr)
- Michael Crichton — Pirate Latitudes, Micro, Dragon Teeth
- René Daumal — Mount Analogue
- James De Mille — A Strange Manuscript Found in a Copper Cylinder
- Ella Cara Deloria — Waterlily (1980)
- Michael Dibdin — End Games
- Philip K. Dick — Gather Yourselves Together, Radio Free Albemuth, Humpty Dumpty in Oakland, Voices from the Street
- Charles Dickens — The Mystery of Edwin Drood
- Benjamin Disraeli — Falconet
- Siobhan Dowd — Bog Child, Solace of the Road
- Gardner Dozois — Book of Magic (editor), City Under the Stars (with Michael Swanwick)
- Alexandre Dumas — The Knight of Sainte-Hermine (with Claude Schopp)
- G.B. Edwards — The Book of Ebenezer Le Page
- E. R. Eddison — The Mezentian Gate
- Harlan Ellison — Blood’s a Rover
- Ralph Ellison — Juneteenth, Three Days Before the Shooting...
- Hans Fallada — Every Man Dies Alone
- Louise Fitzhugh — Sport
- F. Scott Fitzgerald — The Last Tycoon
- Gustave Flaubert* — Bouvard et Pécuchet
- Ian Fleming — Chitty-Chitty-Bang-Bang, The Man with the Golden Gun, Octopussy and The Living Daylights
- C. S. Forester — Hornblower and the Crisis, "The Last Encounter", Gold from Crete, The Pursued
- E. M. Forster — Maurice
- William Gaddis — Agapē Agape
- Gabriel García Márquez — Until August
- Romain Gary* — Vie et Mort d'Émile Ajar, L'homme à la Colombe, L'orage
- Hugo Gernsback — Ultimate World
- William Golding — The Double Tongue
- René Goscinny — Asterix in Belgium (with Albert Uderzo)
- Rob Grant — Red Dwarf: Titan (with Andrew Marshall
- H. Rider Haggard — The Treasure of the Lake, Allan and the Ice-gods, Mary of Marion Isle, Belshazzar
- Alex Haley — Queen: The Story of an American Family (with David Stevens)
- Kenneth Halliwell — Lord Cucumber and The Boy Hairdresser (with Joe Orton)
- Jean Harlow — Today is Tonight (with Carey Wilson)
- E. Lynn Harris — Mama Dearest
- Jaroslav Hašek — The Glorious Licking Continues (Pokračování slavného výprasku), the unfinished fourth volume of The Good Soldier Švejk
- Robert A. Heinlein — For Us, the Living, Variable Star (with Spider Robinson), The Pursuit of the Pankera
- Joseph Heller — Portrait of an Artist, as an Old Man
- Ernest Hemingway* — Islands in the Stream, The Garden of Eden, True at First Light, The Dangerous Summer, and Under Kilimanjaro
- Frank Herbert — High-Opp, Angels' Fall, A Game of Authors, A Thorn in the Bush
- Hergé — Tintin and Alph-Art (assembled by Benoît Peeters, Michel Bareau, and Jean-Manuel Duvivier)
- Winifred Holtby — South Riding (with Vera Brittain)
- Robert E. Howard — A Gent from Bear Creek, Almuric
- Deborah Howe — Bunnicula: A Rabbit-Tale of Mystery
- Shirley Jackson — "Paranoia" (short story), Come Along with Me, containing her unfinished last novel, as well as 14 previously uncollected short stories and three lectures. Later, an additional collection of unpublished stories, Just an Ordinary Day
- Brian Jacques — The Rogue Crew
- M. R. James — "The Fenstanton Witch"
- Tove Jansson — The True Deceiver and Traveling Light, et al.
- Alfred Jarry — Exploits and Opinions of Dr. Faustroll, Pataphysician
- W. E. Johns — Biggles Does Some Homework, Biggles: Air Ace
- B. S. Johnson — See the Old Lady Decently
- Robert Jordan — The Gathering Storm, Towers of Midnight, and A Memory of Light (all with Brandon Sanderson)
- Franz Kafka — The Trial, The Castle, and Amerika, as well as many short stories
- Arnie Kantrowitz — Song of Myself: A Novel
- Giuseppe Tomasi di Lampedusa* — The Leopard
- Stieg Larsson — The Girl with the Dragon Tattoo, The Girl Who Played with Fire, and The Girl Who Kicked the Hornets' Nest
- John le Carré — Silverview
- Ursula K. Le Guin — Firelight, The Daughter of Odren, Pity and Shame
- Fritz Leiber — The Dealings of Daniel Kesserich
- Édouard Levé — Suicide
- Jack London — Jerry of the Islands, Michael, Brother of Jerry, The Red One, Hearts of Three, The Assassination Bureau, Ltd (with Robert L. Fish)
- Huey Long — My First Days in the White House
- Robert Ludlum — The Janson Directive
- Katherine Mansfield — The Doves' Nest
- William March — Poor Pilgrim, Poor Stranger, 99 Fables
- Bruce Marshall — An Account of Capers
- George du Maurier — The Martian
- Anne McCaffrey — Sky Dragons (with Todd McCaffrey)
- Michael McDowell — Candles Burning
- Herman Melville — Billy Budd
- James A. Michener — Matecumbe
- Walter M. Miller Jr. — Saint Leibowitz and the Wild Horse Woman (with Terry Bisson)
- Katherine Min — The Fetishist
- Yukio Mishima — The Decay of the Angel
- Margaret Mitchell — Lost Laysen
- Vladimir Nabokov — The Original of Laura
- Irène Némirovsky — Suite française
- Frank Norris — The Pit: A Story of Chicago, Vandover and the Brute
- Patrick O'Brian — The Final Unfinished Voyage of Jack Aubrey
- Flann O'Brien — The Third Policeman
- Robert C. O'Brien — Z for Zachariah (with Sally M. Conly and Jane Leslie Conly)
- Joe Orton — Head to Toe, Lord Cucumber, and The Boy Hairdresser (the latter two with Kenneth Halliwell)
- Robert B. Parker — Split Image
- Mervyn Peake — Titus Awakes
- Petronius — Satyricon
- Edgar Allan Poe* — The Light-House
- Karel Poláček — There Were Five of Us (Czech: Bylo nás pět)
- Jan Potocki — The Manuscript Found in Saragossa
- Terry Pratchett — The Shepherd's Crown, The Long Utopia, The Long Cosmos (the latter two with Stephen Baxter)
- Mario Puzo — Omertà; The Family
- Arthur Ransome — Coots in the North
- Dr. Seuss — Daisy-Head Mayzie, My Many Colored Days, Hooray for Diffendoofer Day! (with Jack Prelutsky), What Pet Should I Get?
- Yaakov Shabtai — Past Perfect
- Mary Ann Shaffer (and Annie Barrows) — The Guernsey Literary and Potato Peel Pie Society
- M. P. Shiel — The New King
- Nevil Shute — Trustee from the Toolroom
- Philip Sidney* — The Countess of Pembroke's Arcadia
- Shel Silverstein* — Runny Babbit
- Thorne Smith — The Passionate Witch (with Norman H. Matson)
- Theodore Sturgeon — Godbody
- James Tiptree Jr. — Come Live With Me, Backward, Turn Backward, The Earth Doth Like a Snake Renew
- J. R. R. Tolkien — The Silmarillion (assembled by Christopher Tolkien), The Children of Húrin (published 35 years after his death; also assembled by Christopher Tolkien). Other posthumous publications can be found here.
- Leo Tolstoy* — Hadji Murat
- John Kennedy Toole — A Confederacy of Dunces, The Neon Bible
- Robert Tressell — The Ragged-Trousered Philanthropists
- Mark Twain — The Mysterious Stranger
- Jules Verne — The Lighthouse at the End of the World, The Golden Volcano, The Thompson Travel Agency, The Chase of the Golden Meteor, The Danube Pilot, The Survivors of the "Jonathan", The Secret of Wilhelm Storitz, "The Eternal Adam", The Barsac Mission, Paris in the Twentieth Century, Backwards to Britain
- Kurt Vonnegut* — Armageddon in Retrospect, Look at the Birdie, Sucker's Portfolio, While Mortals Sleep
- David Foster Wallace — The Pale King (assembled by Michael Pietsch)
- Edward Lewis Wallant — The Tenants of Moonbloom, The Children at the Gate
- H. G. Wells — The Desert Daisy, The Haunted Ceiling
- Edward Noyes Westcott — David Harum (published version assembled by Ripley Hitchcock)
- Donald E. Westlake — Memory
- Thomas Wolfe — The Web and the Rock, You Can't Go Home Again, The Hounds of Darkness, The Hills Beyond (all assembled by Maxwell Perkins and Edward Aswell)
- Mary Wollstonecraft — Maria: or, The Wrongs of Woman (later chapters assembled by William Godwin)
- Virginia Woolf — Between the Acts
- John Wyndham — Web, Exiles on Asperus, No Place Like Earth
- Roger Zelazny — Donnerjack, Lord Demon (with Jane Lindskold)

=== Plays ===
- Angela Carter* — The Curious Room (also scripts)
- Federico García Lorca* — The House of Bernarda Alba, The Public
- Alexander Griboyedov — Woe from Wit, A Georgian Night
- Sarah Kane — 4.48 Psychosis
- Philip Sidney* — The Lady of May
- Leo Tolstoy* — The Living Corpse

=== Poetry ===
- Richard Beckinsale — With Love
- Charles Bukowski* — over twenty books of poetry and short stories
- Emily Dickinson* — virtually all of her poems
- Federico García Lorca* — Diván del Tamarit, Poet in New York, Yerma, Sonnets of Dark Love
- Mikhail Lermontov — Demon, The Princess of the Tide, Valerik
- Christopher Marlowe — Hero and Leander (with George Chapman), The Passionate Shepherd to His Love
- Thomas Overbury — A Wife, Characters, The Remedy of Love, Observations in Foreign Travels
- Wilfred Owen — almost all of his poems, the first edition being 24 Poems (1920)
- Persius — Satires
- Sylvia Plath — Ariel, Ennui
- Edgar Allan Poe* — The Bells, Annabel Lee, Alone, An Acrostic
- Philip Sidney* — Astrophel and Stella
- Shel Silverstein* — Every Thing On It
- Virgil — Aeneid
- Đoàn Thị Điểm — Nữ Trung Tùng Phận

== Non-fiction ==
=== Autobiographies, biographies, memoirs, diaries and letters ===
The best-known writings of Holocaust victims are listed here, but for a more complete catalog, see List of posthumous publications of Holocaust victims.

- Julius Caesar — Commentarii de Bello Civili
- Hélène Berr — The Journal of Hélène Berr
- Agatha Christie* — Agatha Christie: An Autobiography
- Rachel Corrie — Let Me Stand Alone
- Adam Czerniaków — The Warsaw Diary of Adam Czerniakow: Prelude to Doom
- Emily Dickinson* — her letters
- Verrier Elwin — The Tribal World of Verrier Elwin
- Richard Feynman — What Do You Care What Other People Think?
- Moshe Flinker — Young Moshe's Diary: The Spiritual Torment of a Jewish Boy in Nazi Europe
- Anne Frank — The Diary of a Young Girl
- Julius Fučík — Notes from the Gallows
- Frankie Gaye — Marvin Gaye: My Brother
- Petr Ginz — The Diary of Petr Ginz
- Archibald Gracie IV — The Truth About the Titanic (assembled and published by Mitchell Kennerley)
- Ernest Hemingway* — A Moveable Feast
- Etty Hillesum — An Interrupted Life: The Diaries of Etty Hillesum, 1941-1943
- David Koker — At the Edge of the Abyss: A Concentration Camp Diary, 1943-1944
- Janusz Korczak — Ghetto Diary
- Sergei Kourdakov — The Persecutor (autobiography)
- Rutka Laskier — Rutka's Notebook
- Kim Malthe-Bruun — Heroic Heart: The Diary and Letters of Kim Malthe-Bruun (titled Kim in Denmark)
- Manning Marable — Malcolm X: A Life of Reinvention
- Eliot Ness — The Untouchables (with Oscar Fraley)
- Pliny the Younger — Letters, Book Ten (to and from the Roman Emperor Trajan)
- Robbie Robertson — Insomnia
- Oskar Rosenfeld — In the Beginning Was the Ghetto: Notebooks from Lodz
- Yitskhok Rudashevski — Diary of the Vilna Ghetto
- Philip Slier — Hidden Letters
- Malcolm X — The Autobiography of Malcolm X (with Alex Haley)

=== Philosophy ===
- Marcus Aurelius — Meditations
- Walter Benjamin — Theses on the Philosophy of History, Arcades Project (assembled by Rolf Tiedemann; translated by Howard Eiland and Kevin McLaughlin)
- Antonio Gramsci — Prison Notebooks
- David Hume — Dialogues Concerning Natural Religion
- Edmund Husserl — Experience and Judgment (edited by Ludwig Landgrebe)
- Martin Heidegger — Contributions to Philosophy, Insight Into What Is
- Søren Kierkegaard — The Point of View of My Work as an Author, Writing Sampler, Judge for Yourselves!
- Gottfried Wilhelm Leibniz — The Monadology
- Friedrich Nietzsche — The Will to Power (assembled by Elisabeth Förster-Nietzsche and Heinrich Köselitz)
- Baruch Spinoza — Ethics
- Max Weber — 'Economy and Society'
- Ludwig Wittgenstein — Philosophical Investigations (edited and translated by G. E. M. Anscombe)

=== Other non-fiction ===
- Georgius Agricola — De re metallica
- Douglas Adams* — The Salmon of Doubt (essays, as well as an incomplete novel)
- Albert Camus* — nine publications of notebooks and collected essays
- Heinz Cassirer — God's New Covenant: A New Testament Translation
- Geoffrey Chaucer* — A Treatise on the Astrolabe
- Carl von Clausewitz — On War
- Bruce Chatwin* — Photographs and Notebooks, Anatomy of Restlessness (a collection of essays and articles, as well as short stories and travel tales), Winding Paths
- Roald Dahl — Roald Dahl's Guide to Railway Safety
- David James Davies — Towards Welsh Freedom
- Ferdinand de Saussure* — Cours de linguistique générale 1916, edited by Charles Bally & Albert Sechehaye
- Gustave Flaubert* — Dictionary of Received Ideas
- Wilson Follett — Follett's Modern American Usage
- Gabriel García Márquez — The Scandal of the Century: Selected Journalistic Writings, 1950–1984
- Romain Gary — L'affaire Homme
- Lauren Grandcolas — You Can Do It!: The Merit Badge Handbook for Grown-Up Girls
- C. L. R. James — American Civilization
- Humphrey Jennings — Pandaemonium, 1660–1886: The Coming of the Machine as Seen by Contemporary Observer
- Joseph Joubert — Recueil des pensées de M. Joubert
- Carl Jung — The Red Book
- Thomas à Kempis — The Imitation of Christ
- Giuseppe Tomasi di Lampedusa* — Stories, Lessons on Stendhal, Introduction to Sixteenth Century French Literature
- Niccolò Machiavelli — The Prince
- Isaac Newton — The Chronology of Ancient Kingdoms Amended, Method of Fluxions
- Barbara Olson — The Final Days: The Last, Desperate Abuses of Power by the Clinton White House
- Thomas Overbury — Observations in Foreign Travels
- Carl Sagan — Billions and Billions
- Philip Sidney* — An Apology for Poetry
- Edmund Spenser — A View of the Present State of Ireland
- Kurt Vonnegut* — Armageddon in Retrospect, Sucker's Portfolio (essays and short stories)

== See also ==
- Unfinished work
- List of music released posthumously
- List of unfinished novels completed by others
- List of television performers who died during production
- List of entertainers who died during a performance
