= The Light at the End of the World =

The Light at the End of the World or Light at the End of the World may refer to:

- Light at the End of the World, a 2007 album by Erasure
- The Light at the End of the World (A Flock of Seagulls album), 1995
- The Light at the End of the World (My Dying Bride album), 1999

== See also ==
- The Lighthouse at the End of the World (Le Phare du bout du monde), Jules Verne's novel drafted in 1901 and published posthumously in 1905
- The Light at the Edge of the World, a 1971 film based on Jules Verne's 1905 novel
