= Matecumbe =

Neighborhood in Islamorada, Florida, United States

Matecumbe is a neighborhood within the village of Islamorada in Monroe County, Florida, United States. It is located in the upper Florida Keys on the island of Upper Matecumbe Key.

== Geography ==
It is located at 24.914°N 80.639°W, its elevation 7 feet (2 m). Matecumbe consists of two islands (keys), Upper Matecumbe Key and Lower Matecumbe Key. The latter is where the settlement of Matecumbe is located, just south of Matecumbe Bight and adjacent to and just north of Matecumbe Harbor. The settlement was the location of one of the stations of the Overseas Railroad.

The name Matecumbe refers to a region of area in the Upper Keys. It is the only place name in South Florida which dates from the 16th century and still designates the same or approximate location. The name appears frequently on Spanish maps, as it did in their records. The exact meaning of the name is unknown, but the suggestion that it was derived from the Spanish mata hombre is a weak one. When the term Matecumbe first appeared in use it was in a form very close to its present spelling and pronunciation. As was often the case in Florida, the name was applied interchangeably to the chief and to the tribe.

This was one of the first of the Upper Keys to be permanently settled. Early homesteaders were so successful at growing pineapples in the rocky soil that at one time the island yielded the country's largest annual crop. However, foreign competition and the hurricane of 1935 killed the industry. Today, life centers on fishing and tourism, and the island is filled with bait shops, marinas, and charter-fishing boats.

== Books ==
Pulitzer Prize-winning author James A. Michener was in his sixties when he began traveling frequently to the Florida Keys. One result of those visits was the unfinished, posthumous novel Matecumbe.

Robert Lewis Taylor's 1961 novel A Journey to Matecumbe was adapted in 1976 as the Disney movie Treasure of Matecumbe.
