= The Fetishist =

The Fetishist may refer to:

- The Fetishist (Tournier book), a 1978 short story collection by Michel Tournier
- The Fetishist (Min novel), a 2024 novel by Katherine Min
