= Michel Verne =

French novelist (1861–1925)

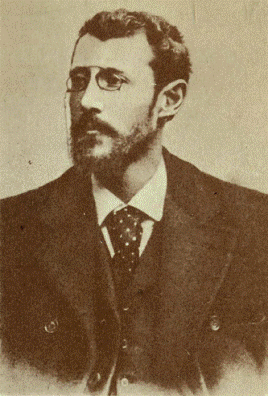
- Portrait of Michel Verne, 1891
- Born: 3 August 1861; Paris, France
- Died: 5 March 1925 (aged 63); Toulon, France
- Occupation: Novelist
- Spouse: Clémence-Thérèse Taton (1884-1889) Jeanne Reboul (1890-1823)
- Children: 3
- Parent: Jules Verne

Michel Jean Pierre Verne (3 August 1861 – 5 March 1925) was a French novelist and editor, who was the son of Jules Verne. He was best known for his adventure novels, which included The Lighthouse at the End of the World (1905), The Golden Volcano (1906), and The Thompson Travel Agency (1907).

== Early life ==
Michel was born in Paris, France. Because of his wayward behaviour, he was sent by his father to Mettray Penal Colony, a private reformatory near Tours, for six months during 1876. By the age of 19, he caused a scandal by eloping with, Clémence-Thérèse Taton, an actress despite his famous father's objections. By 1883, his father was reconciled to the marriage and Michel got married—only to abandon his newlywed wife and begin a relationship with 16-year-old Jeanne Reboul, with whom he had two children before his divorce was finalized. These and other issues strained the relationship between Michel and his father, but by the time Jules died in 1905, relations between them had improved and they had collaborated on some stories.

== Career ==
Michel was in charge of publishing many of his father's last manuscripts, and it is rumored that Michel may have written some of them himself. Works previously attributed to Jules Verne but now considered to have been written by Michel include The Lighthouse at the End of the World, The Golden Volcano (in two parts, Claim On Forty Mile Creek and Flood and Flame) and The Thompson Travel Agency. Michel Verne wrote in a similar genre to his father, and was considered by his father to be a good writer, but his works are now generally considered to be inferior to those of his father.

Some of his works, like Un Express de L'Avenir and In the Year 2889 are notable for their use of pneumatic tubes.

== Works by Michel Verne ==
- The Thompson Travel Agency (1907)
- La Destinée de Jean Morénas
- L'Éternel Adam (The Eternal Adam, Short Story)
- Un Express de L'Avenir
- A Great Transatlantic Subway (Short Story)
- In the Year 2889 (Short Story)
- Survivors of the Jonathan (published in two parts in English as Masterless Man and Unwilling Dictator)
- The Barsac Mission (1914)
