= The Thompson Travel Agency =

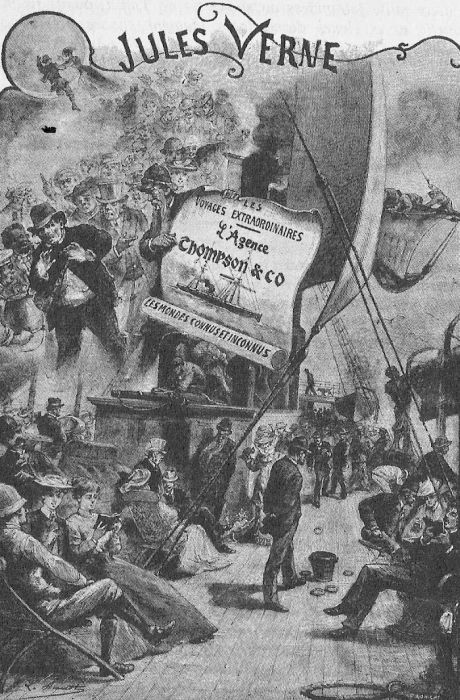
- Frontispiece of the original edition
- Author: Michel Verne (writing as Jules Verne)
- Original title: L’Agence Thompson and Co
- Translator: I. O. Evans
- Illustrator: Léon Benett
- Language: French
- Series: Voyages Extraordinaires
- Publisher: J. Hetzel et Cie
- Publication date: 1907
- Publication place: France
- English publication date: 1965
- Media type: Print

The Thompson Travel Agency (French: L’Agence Thompson et Co, literally The Agency Thompson & Co.) is a 1907 novel attributed to Jules Verne but written by his son Michel Verne.

== Plot ==
The novel begins in London, where an impoverished French teacher named Robert Morgand applies at the travel agency Baker & Company for the post of guide and interpreter for a tour of three archipelagos: the Azores, the Madeira Islands, and the Canary Islands. Because Morgand speaks fluent English, Spanish and Portuguese, he easily wins the job. During the days following, however, Morgand sees an advertisement for a rival agency, Thompson & Company, offering the same tour at a better price. Both travel agents compete until Morgan's employer Baker is forced to cancel its tour. The triumphant Thompson agency, however, also needs an interpreter, and Morgand is given the job, though at much less pay.

Morgand begins his services on the steamer Seamew. Aboard are more than a hundred tourists as well as Mr. Thompson himself, the owner of the travel agency. During the voyage it becomes evident that Mr. Thompson, an irresponsible and money-obsessed businessman, has planned neither the ocean voyage nor the visits to land; everything has to be arranged during the voyage. Problems occur, food spoils, and travelers become increasingly dissatisfied on the way from the Azores to Madeira. During the voyage, Morgand becomes enamoured with a female passenger, a young American widow named Alice Lindsay. Their romance is threatened by her brother-in-law and rejected admirer, Jack Lindsay, who is pursuing Alice for her money. Meanwhile, Alice Lindsay's nineteen-year-old sister Dolly becomes enamoured with a kindly French officer-on-leave, Roger de Sorgues.

The journey continues through Gran Canaria and Tenerife, where the travelers climb Mount Teide. During the return voyage to Britain, however, the engines of the Seamew fail, and the ship is forced to proceed at a much slower pace, driven by sail only. The ship is finally wrecked near Cape Verde, but the survivors make it to the shore and eventually to continental Africa, where they are captured by Bedouins who attempt to ransom them. In the ensuing adventures, Jack Lindsay is killed in battle, but the other survivors are finally rescued. The novel ends happily with a double wedding: Robert Morgand with Alice Lindsay, and Roger de Sorgues with Dolly. The voyage ends out well even for Mr. Thompson, who, despite his creditors and disgruntled passengers, cleverly manages to avoid bankruptcy.

== Publication history ==
The novel was serialized in the newspaper Le Journal from October 17, 1907 to December 25, 1907, and published by Hetzel et Cie in book form the same year. An English translation by I. O. Evans was published in two volumes (Package Holiday and End of the Journey) in 1965.

The publisher's claim that the novel was a posthumous work by Jules Verne was accepted for more than a century, until the discovery of the original manuscript proved Michel Verne's authorship.
