= David Miller (director) =

American film director

- Born: November 28, 1909; Paterson, New Jersey, United States
- Died: April 14, 1992 (aged 82); Los Angeles, California, United States
- Occupation: Film director

David Miller (November 28, 1909 – April 14, 1992) was an American film director who directed varied films such as Billy the Kid (1941) with Robert Taylor and Brian Donlevy, Flying Tigers (1943) with John Wayne, and Love Happy (1949) with the Marx Brothers.

Emanuel Levy wrote in 2009 that Lonely are the Brave (1962), starring Kirk Douglas, "is the most accomplished film of David Miller, who directs with eloquent feeling for landscape and attention to character." Others feel that Miller's best is his 1952 noir thriller and Joan Crawford vehicle Sudden Fear co-starring Jack Palance and Gloria Grahame. Sudden Fear was nominated for four Academy Awards for Best Actress (Crawford), Best Actor (Palance), Best Costume Design and Best Cinematography by Charles Lang but was a box office failure.

== Filmography ==
- India Speaks (1933) – editor
- Trained Hoofs (1935)
- Crew Racing (1935)
- Let's Dance (1936)
- Table Tennis (1936)
- Hurling (1936)
- Dexterity (1937)
- Penny Wisdom (1937)
- Tennis Tactics (1937)
- Equestrian Acrobats (1937)
- La Savate (1938)
- It's in the Stars (1938)
- Fisticuffs (1938)
- Nostradamus (1938)
- The Great Heart (1938)
- Ice Antics (1939)
- Drunk Driving (1939)
- The Happiest Man on Earth (1940)
- More About Nostradamus (1941)
- Billy the Kid (1941)
- Sunday Punch (1942)
- Further Prophecies of Nostradamus (1942)
- Flying Tigers (1942)
- Seeds of Destiny (1946)
- Top o' the Morning (1949)
- Love Happy (1949)
- Our Very Own (1950)
- Saturday's Hero (1951)
- Sudden Fear (1952)
- Twist of Fate a.k.a. Beautiful Stranger (1954)
- Diane (1956)
- The Opposite Sex (1956)
- The Story of Esther Costello (1957)
- Happy Anniversary (1959)
- Midnight Lace (1960)
- Back Street (1961)
- Lonely Are the Brave (1962)
- Captain Newman, M.D. (1963)
- The Bells Of Hell Go Ting-a-ling-a-ling (1966: unfinished and unreleased)
- Hammerhead (1968)
- Hail, Hero! (1969)
- Executive Action (1973)
- Bittersweet Love (1976)
- The Best Place to Be (1979)
- Love for Rent (1979)
- Goldie and the Boxer (1979)
- Goldie and the Boxer Go to Hollywood (1981)
