= Voices from the Street =

2007 novel by Philip K. Dick

Voices From the Street
- Cover of first edition (hardcover)
- Author: Philip K. Dick
- Language: English
- Publisher: Tor Books
- Publication date: 2007
- Publication place: United States
- Media type: Print (hardback & paperback)
- Pages: 301
- ISBN: 0-7653-1692-7
- OCLC: 74460715
- Dewey Decimal: 813/.54 22
- LC Class: PS3554.I3 V65 2007

Voices From The Street is an early realist novel by American science fiction author Philip K. Dick, written in the early 1950s. Unpublished at the time, it was released on January 23, 2007, by Tor Books for the first time.

As with many of his early books which were considered unsuitable for publication when they were first submitted as manuscripts, this was not science fiction, but rather literary fiction. The original manuscript was 547 pages in length. There is some speculation that the unpleasant marriage in the manuscript may be an attempt by Dick to sort out his own faltering second marriage to Kleo Apostolides (1950–58), as noted in Lawrence Sutin's and Emmanuel Carrère's biographies of the author.

== Connections to other Dick works ==
Hadley's boss, Jim Fergesson, appeared briefly in Dick's previous novel Gather Yourselves Together as well as in Humpty Dumpty in Oakland, this time as the proprietor of a television and radio repair shop. Fergessen makes a final appearance in Dick's later post-apocalyptic science fiction novel Dr. Bloodmoney, cast in his original role of proprietor of a television and radio repair shop (although he is killed in the opening stages of World War III).

Hadley’s coworker Olsen, the in-house television repairman, as well as Fergessen’s store Modern TV Sales & Service reappear in Puttering About in a Small Land. The character of Betty, the proprietress of the nearby health food store is reused in Humpty Dumpty in Oakland.

The character of Stuart Hadley returns in Dr. Bloodmoney as a black man by the name of Stuart McConchie, as opposed to the Caucasian character from Voices from the Street, and again in Dick's science fiction novel The Crack in Space. In this novel Hadley is once again Caucasian and works for a character named Darius Pethel, who is essentially the same as Fergesson. The character of Al Miller performs a similar role as Hadley to the Fergessen of Humpty Dumpty in Oakland, though he is less overtly-antagonistic to other characters as the Hadley from Voices from the Street. Additionally while Miller operates a business that is independent of Fergesson’s repair shop (no longer making Miller/Hadley Fergesson’s employee) he leases space from him for his used-car lot and relies heavily on Fergesson’s expertise to rehabilitate his vehicles. Fergesson’s decision to close his shop drives much of the events in that novel.

Despite the multiple appearances and interrelations of these characters the respective worlds are all mutually exclusive and the characters make no reference to incidents that occur in either earlier or later work.

== Bibliography ==
- Bibliography of Philip K. Dick
