= The Persecutor =

1973 autobiography by Sergei Kourdakov

The Persecutor Forgive Me Natasha
- The Persecutor book cover
- Author: Sergei Kourdakov
- Language: English
- Publisher: Fleming H. Revell Company (Baker Publishing Group); Revell (Baker Publishing Group); Ballantine Books
- Publication date: 1973
- Publication place: United States
- Media type: Print (Hardback & Paperback)
- Pages: 253
- ISBN: 0-8007-0631-5
- OCLC: 703265

The Persecutor, also known as Forgive Me Natasha and less commonly as Sergei, is the autobiography of Sergei Kourdakov, a former KGB agent who persecuted Christians in the Soviet Union in the 1970s, but defected to Canada in 1971 and converted to Evangelical Christianity. The book was finished shortly before his death in January 1973 and published posthumously.

It was published in English, then translated to at least fourteen languages including German, Spanish, French, Russian, and Dutch. Although the English versions have since ceased publication, various foreign-language versions are still in print.

== Background ==
The Persecutor details Sergei Kourdakov's early life in Novosibirsk Oblast, his life as an orphan, the raids he led on private Christian assemblies while a Naval academy student in Petropavlovsk-Kamchatsky, his defection to Canada, and his new life in Canada and the United States. The book opens with Kourdakov's escape to Canada. Beginning with the second chapter, the book flashes back to Kourdakov's childhood.

== Plot Account ==
Sergei Kourdakov was a Soviet defector to Canada in 1971, later residing in the United States. His public criticism of the Soviet state and his death under disputed circumstances became subjects of international attention during the Cold War.

Kourdakov defected while serving as a naval cadet, escaping from Soviet ship during a storm near the Queen Charlotte Islands, Canada. His request for asylum was granted following a public campaign against his potential extradition. His decision to defect occurred within the context of life in the Soviet Union, where many citizens experienced state control of the economy, political repression, and the suppression of religious practices especially Christianity.

After receiving asylum, Kourdakov relocated to Toronto. He became affiliated with a Ukrainian Christian church and began giving public lectures and writing about the persecution of Christians in the country. He wrote a manuscript detailing his former role in enforcing state atheism and the book, The Persecutor was published posthumously.

In January 1973, at the age of 21, Kourdakov was found dead from a gunshot wound to his head in a Los Angeles motel room. The official investigation concluded that his death was a suicide. Meanwhile, prior to his death, he had told his associates that he believed Soviet agents might attempt to kill him for speaking out about the repression of religion and living conditions of the people in the country, and stage his death as an accident or suicide. The circumstances of his death remain a point of discussion in historical accounts of Cold War defections.

== Criticism ==
The Persecutor has been met with varied criticism regarding its authorship and accuracy. Some, such as Albert W. Wardin, believe that the biography was at least partially written by members of Underground Evangelism, the Christian organization which Kourdakov was a member of that helped smuggle Bibles into communist countries. Wardin also claims that the book gives a distorted view of evangelical life in the Soviet Union, stating that "the allegation that for years before the late 1960s there was not even one Protestant church in Novosibirsk is untrue" and that "the figure of 30,000 Initiative Baptists in Kamthatka [...] and that of over 150 attacks in two years seems unbelievably high."

In 2004, United States Christian journalist Caroline Walker released a drama documentary about The Persecutor. Claiming to have been given a vision from God, she traveled to Siberia to investigate various parts of book. Through the film, she claims that contrary to her own expectations, there are many inconsistencies in the autobiography, such as the section dealing with Sergei's experience in the Barysevo Orphanage as a child. The documentary, titled Forgive Me, Sergei (a pun on the autobiography title), was co-produced and directed by Polish Jesuit Damian Wojciechowski, whom she met during her investigation. He was also attempting to film a documentary on Kourdakov's life, but was struggling with inconsistencies in the book.

"On the first film shoot, I recognized that the book was much further from the truth than what I had first thought and might simply be fiction."

— Damian Wojciechowski

The documentary received multiple awards at film festivals.

== See also ==
- Persecution of Christians in the Soviet Union
- List of works published posthumously
