= Humpty Dumpty in Oakland =

1986 novel authored by Philip K. Dick

- Dust-jacket from the first edition
- Author: Philip K. Dick
- Language: English
- Publisher: Gollancz
- Publication date: 1986
- Publication place: United States
- Media type: Print (Hardback)
- Pages: 199 pp
- ISBN: 0-575-03875-6
- OCLC: 13823287

Humpty Dumpty in Oakland is a realist, non-science fiction novel authored by Philip K. Dick. Originally completed in 1960, but rejected by prior publishers, this work was posthumously published by Gollancz in the United Kingdom in 1986. An American edition was published by Tor Books in 2007.

== Background ==
Between 1952 and 1960, Dick wrote eleven non-science-fiction novels, all of which were rejected by multiple publishers. Nonetheless, editor Don Wickenden of Harcourt Brace saw potential in Dick's mainstream works, and in December 1959, the company offered Dick a $500 advance for a new novel, with the promise of a further $500 on completion of a saleable manuscript. Dick was expected to work in collaboration with another editor at Harcourt Brace, Eleanor Dimoff, but he refused to make the flight to New York, so he and Dimoff corresponded by mail.

Dick proposed to rewrite one of his earlier works, A Time for George Stavros. Little is known about this now-lost manuscript, but it is characterized as follows in an index-card written by an employee of the Scott Meredith Literary Agency:

Long, rambling, glum novel about 65 yr old Greek immigrant who has a weakling son, a second son about whom he's indifferent, a wife who doesn't love him (she's being unfaithful to him). Nothing much happens. Guy, selling garage & retiring, tries to buy another garage in new development, has a couple of falls, dies at end. Point is murky but seems to be that world is disintegrating, Stavros supposed to be symbol of vigorous individuality now a lost commodity.

In a letter to Dimoff dated February 1, 1960, Dick outlined his idea for the reworked version of this novel. The garage would become a retail store, and the story would explore the family-like relationship between Stavros and his employees. A new member of staff, Verne Tildon (a character borrowed from Gather Yourselves Together) would interfere with the cosy dynamic. Initially being like a son to Stavros, he would ultimately attempt to overthrow him, so that "all the apparatus of the son-father clash is transformed into new terms, into salesmen, bookkeepers, floor managers, company policy, etc." Harcourt Brace approved the concept.

During this time, Dick's wife Anne was heavily pregnant. In her 1995 biography, Anne claims that the reason Dick decided to fulfill his contract by rewriting an earlier novel was to give himself more time to help care for the new baby. The manuscript that was finally submitted to Harcourt Brace in October 1960, under the title of Humpty Dumpty in Oakland, bore little resemblance to the story that Dick had outlined in his letter, but followed very closely the plot of George Stavros. Harcourt Brace rejected it, and Dick was forced to return the $500 advance. This was the last attempt Dick made at writing a full-length non-science fiction novel, though he did manage (more than a decade later) to sell one of the ten mainstream novels he had written earlier. (Confessions of a Crap Artist, written in 1959, finally appeared in 1975.)

Dick died in 1982. Humpty Dumpty in Oakland was posthumously published by Gollancz in 1986.

== Plot summary ==
In 1960, 58-year-old Jim Fergesson decides to sell his Oakland-based auto repair business and retire. This threatens to greatly inconvenience his business tenant, used car salesman Al Miller, who rents a lot from Fergesson to sell his battered but superficially reconditioned old jalopies. Chris Harmon, an entrepreneur, advises Fergesson to invest in a new super-garage located in Marin Country Gardens. Jim visits the property, and while there takes a fall in the mud and has a minor heart attack.

Miller is convinced that Harmon is corrupt and makes an amateurish attempt at blackmailing him over his alleged (then-illegal) sale of salacious audio recordings. When this fails, he enters employment with Harmon as a curiously unqualified salesman of classical music. This, as it turns out, was an innocent administrative error. Al's actual assignment now involves the mass marketing of barbershop music. Fergesson, meanwhile, has decided to invest his entire life savings in the Marin Country Gardens project, with Harmon acting as broker. Though still in bad health, he visits Harmon's house to hand over a check, concerned that any delay will cause him to miss the opportunity. Miller, who is also at the house, attempts to disrupt the proceedings, but fails to prevent the check from changing hands. The strain of it all takes its toll on Fergesson, and he dies later that night at home.

Fergesson's widow, Lydia, has bought into Miller's assessment of Harmon, and believes that Jim has been defrauded. She employs legal counsel to try and stop the check. Miller is concerned that Harmon will be after him; this suspicion seems to be confirmed when his wife comes home unexpectedly and tells him that she has been fired, and when he discovers that his used car lot has been ferociously vandalised. Lydia, however, sympathizing with his economic troubles, offers him $2,000 in compensation. He takes the money and flees with his wife to Nevada, attempting to escape from Harmon's sphere of influence.

Miller's wife abandons him halfway through the journey; then, arriving at Salt Lake City, Miller is arrested and brought back to Oakland. He is informed that Fergesson's deal with Harmon was completely legitimate, and Lydia is suing him for fraud. He agrees to return the money that she gave him, though this will require him to sell off all the remaining cars in his lot. He is certain that Harmon is still pulling strings, persecuting him by showing him his own helplessness. Returning home, Miller finds Harmon in his apartment. Harmon speaks to him in friendly terms, and says he wants Miller to continue working for him. Later that night, Miller goes down to his lot and fantasizes about suicide. He is interrupted by a passing visit from his real estate vendor, a vivacious, attractive black woman by the name of Mrs. Lane. Taking pity on him, Mrs. Lane ushers him into her car, and the two drive off together.

== Analysis ==
According to Anne, Dick said that Humpty Dumpty "was exceptional because it was a novel about the proletarian world written from the inside, whereas most novels about the proletarian world were written by middle-class writers who didn't really understand the proletarian life". Greg Rickman called it one of Dick's "gloomiest books". Andrew M. Butler observes that Jim Fergesson, who falls over several times throughout the story, might appear to be the Humpty Dumpty of the title, but it is in fact Al Miller who is heading for destruction.
