= In the Year 2889 (short story) =

1889 short story by Michel Verne

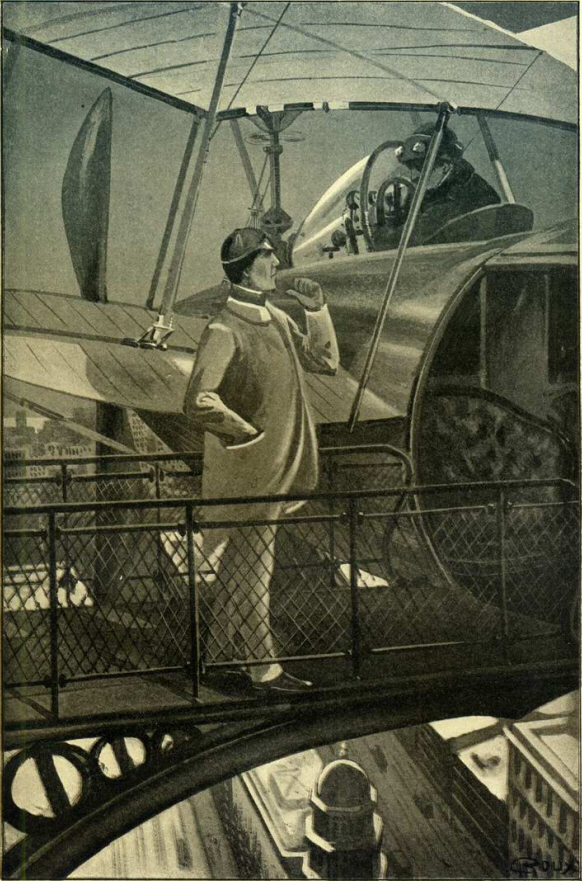
- Illustration by G. Roux to Jules Verne story
- Author: Jules Gabriel Verne, Michel Verne
- Original title: La Journée d’un journaliste américain en 2889
- Language: French
- Genre: Science fiction
- Published: 1889 (The Forum)

In the Year 2889 (La Journée d’un journaliste américain en 2889 in French) is an 1889 short story published under the name of Jules Verne, but now believed to be mainly the work of his son Michel Verne, based on his father's ideas. The first publication was in English in February 1889, in the American magazine The Forum.

== Context ==
Supposedly, the owner of the New York Herald, James Gordon Bennett, Jr, asked Jules Verne to write a short story projecting what life would look like in a thousand years. If written by Jules Verne, it would be one of his few short stories, and the only one first written in English. The story takes place on 25 September 2889.

A 1910 reprint included illustrations by George Roux.

== Predictions ==
The story follows the publisher of a very influential media empire in the year 2889. Among the predictions announced:

- Pneumatic tubes carrying passengers across the oceans at 1,500 km/h.
- Video conferences.
- A life expectancy of 68 years.
- Home delivery of aseptic meals.
- Advertisements projected on clouds.
- "Phototelegrams" from Mars, Mercury and Venus.
- Resolution of equations of the 95th degree.
- A space of 24 dimensions.
- Telescopes of a diameter of 3 km.
- New planets.
- Chemical war, biological war, electric sparks of 20 leagues.
- Natality control in China.
- Flying cars.
- Cryonics.
- The British Empire is reduced to Gibraltar.
- Turning the moon around
- Accumulators that absorb and condense living forces from the sun's rays and returns it in any form desired with a transformer
- News spoken to subscribers instead of being delivered on paper.
- Food scientifically compounded and prepared
- An atmosphere free of microorganisms
- Transmission of images by means of sensitive mirrors connected by wires.

== See also ==
- In the Year 2889 (film)
