= More About Nostradamus =

1941 film

- Titular screenshot
- Directed by: David Miller
- Written by: Carl Dudley
- Produced by: Carey Wilson
- Starring: John Burton
- Cinematography: Charles Lawton Jr.
- Edited by: Adrienne Fazan
- Release date: January 18, 1941
- Running time: 11 minutes
- Country: United States
- Language: English

More About Nostradamus is a 1941 American short film directed by David Miller. In 1941 it was nominated for an Academy Award at the 13th Academy Awards for Best Live Action Short Film, One-Reel.

== Cast ==
- John Burton as Michel de Nostradamus
- Hans Conried as Feliz Paretti later Pope Sixtus V
- James Dime as Grave Digger
- John George as Townsman
