= Prophet Without Honor =

- Directed by: Felix E. Feist
- Written by: Robert Lees; Frederic I. Rinaldo
- Produced by: Carey Wilson
- Narrated by: Carey Wilson
- Cinematography: John F. Seitz
- Edited by: Adrienne Fazan
- Music by: David Snell
- Release date: May 20, 1939
- Running time: 11 minutes
- Country: United States
- Language: English

Prophet Without Honor is a 1939 short documentary film directed by Felix E. Feist. At the 12th Academy Awards, held in 1940, it was nominated for an Academy Award for Best Live Action Short Film, One-Reel. The documentary is about Matthew Fontaine Maury, a U.S. naval officer who created the first maps that charted the oceans' winds and currents.

== Cast ==
- Carey Wilson as Narrator
- Tom Neal as Matthew Fontaine Maury (uncredited)
