= The Great Heart =

1938 film

- Directed by: David Miller
- Screenplay by: Morgan Cox
- Starring: Tom Neal
- Narrated by: Carey Wilson
- Music by: David Snell
- Distributed by: MGM
- Release date: December 31, 1938
- Running time: 11 minutes
- Country: United States
- Language: English

The Great Heart is a 1938 American short film about the life of Father Damien and is directed by David Miller. It was nominated for an Academy Award at the 11th Academy Awards in 1938 for Best Short Subject (One-Reel).

== Cast ==
- Carey Wilson as Narrator
- Tom Neal as Father Damien (uncredited)
