= Godbody =

1986 novel by Theodore Sturgeon

- First edition
- Author: Theodore Sturgeon
- Cover artist: Loretta Trezzo
- Language: English
- Genre: Science fiction
- Publisher: Donald I. Fine
- Publication date: March 1986
- Publication place: United States
- Media type: Print (hardback & paperback)
- Pages: 159 pp
- ISBN: 978-0-917657-79-5

Godbody is a science fiction novel by American writer Theodore Sturgeon, published posthumously in 1986. A foreword, "Agape and Eros: The Art of Theodore Sturgeon", was contributed by Robert A. Heinlein and an afterword was contributed by Stephen R. Donaldson.

== Plot ==
The plot centers around the arrival of a man named Godbody in a small town in New England and explores how his arrival transforms the lives of the residents. Many residents find happiness but Godbody is shot by the town newspaper's gossip columnist who attempts to enforce her views on morality on the townsfolk. In a sequence similar to the Resurrection, Godbody returns to life and departs once more, having encouraged the townsfolk to love one another.

== Reception and significance ==
Algis Budrys gave the novel a mixed review in his review column for The Magazine of Fantasy & Science Fiction: he noted that several scenes are "hardly finished copy" but concluded that "it is clear that the intended effect takes place".

Ben Bova, writing for the Los Angeles Times, called Godbody "a good first draft" but, like Budrys, felt that Sturgeon's inability to fully finish the novel before his death meant that it did not reach its full potential.

John Clute in The Encyclopedia of Science Fiction states that Godbody "weakly reiterates" the transcendence theme of earlier Sturgeon.

Godbody was nominated in 1987 for the Locus Award for Best Fantasy Novel, eventually placing 4th.
