= Mary of Marion Isle =

1929 novel by H. Rider Haggard

- First US edition
- Author: H. Rider Haggard
- Cover artist: Frank Peers
- Language: English
- Publisher: Hutchinson & Co (UK); Doubleday Doran (US)
- Publication date: 1929
- Publication place: United Kingdom

Mary of Marion Isle is a 1929 novel by H Rider Haggard. It was his penultimate novel and was published posthumously. Haggard originally came up with the idea for the novel in 1916 while travelling on a ship from South Africa to Australia and glancing at the islands they passed on the way there.
