= Seeds of Destiny =

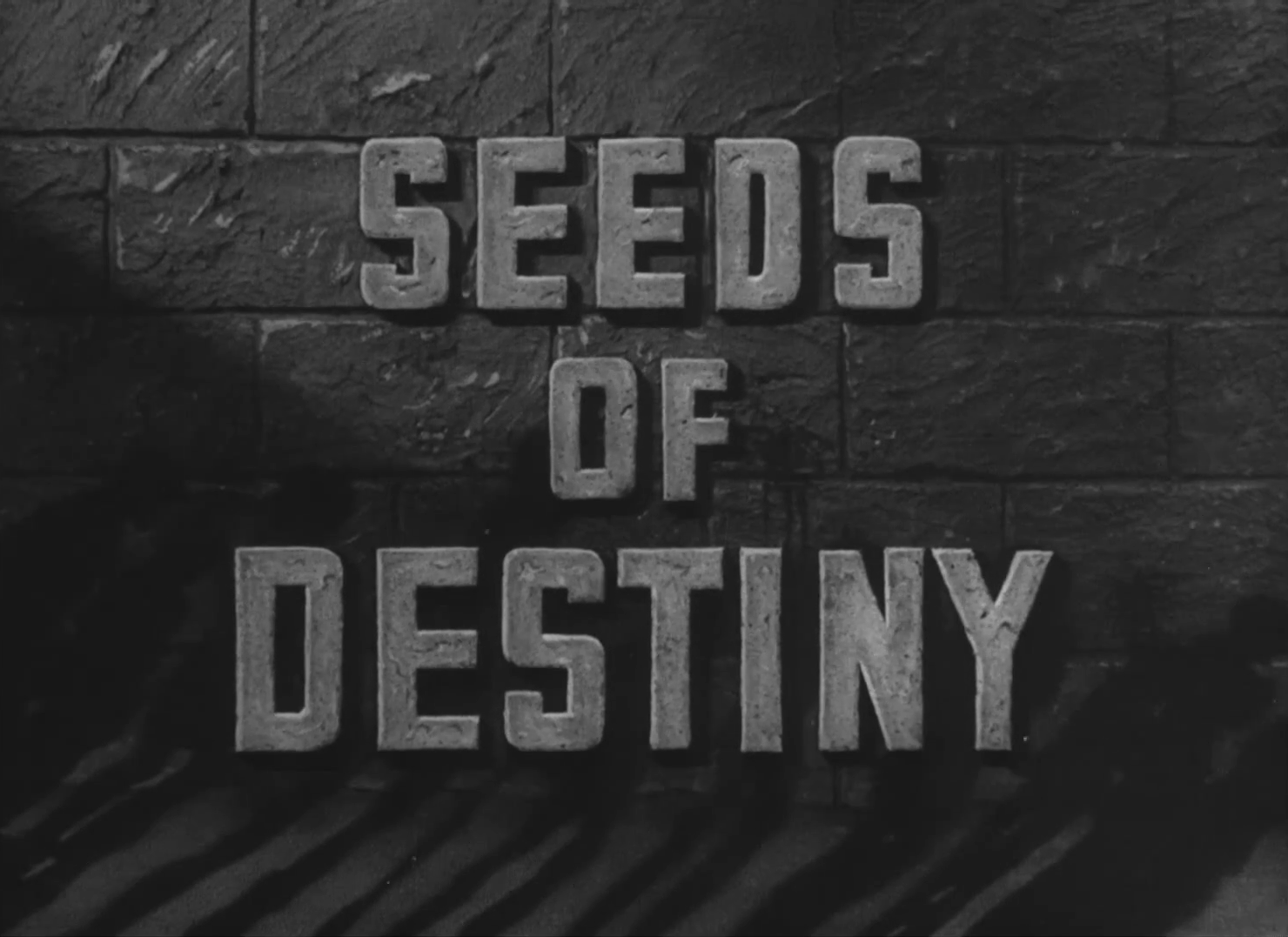
- Title card
- Directed by: David Miller
- Written by: David Miller; Art Arthur
- Narrated by: Ralph Bellamy
- Edited by: Gene Fowler Jr.
- Production company: United States Army Signal Corps
- Distributed by: United States Department of War
- Release date: 1946
- Running time: 20 minutes
- Country: United States
- Language: English
- Box office: $200,000,000+

Full film

Seeds of Destiny is a 1946 short propaganda film about the despairing situation faced by millions of children in the wake of the Holocaust who were homeless, parentless, orphaned, and in poor health. The film was produced by the Defense Department of The U.S. Army War Department to keep the world's attention focused on the suffering of displaced and orphaned refugee children in transit and displaced persons camps in Europe and to champion the work of UNRRA. It was the winner of the Oscar for Best Documentary Short Subject in 1946. It was directed by accomplished short film — and later feature film — director David Miller.

In countries throughout Europe, as soon as an area had been liberated by the armed forces of the United Nations or as a consequence of retreat of the enemy, the U.S. Army Signal Corps filmed dramatic images of neglected and injured children in displaced persons' camps, refugee camps or wandering the streets in the rubble of bombed out cities.

By 1944, the United States had joined with other nations as a signatory with the United Nations Relief and Rehabilitation Administration (UNRRA). The film was premiered before the UNRRA in 1946, and the revenue raised from its distribution was pledged to relieve suffering of the civilians affected by the war, and to assist in their repatriation.

== Production ==
Gene Fowler Jr. is sometimes incorrectly attributed to this film as Director; occasionally he is listed as Creator. He was the Creative Film Editor of this film. The film Director was David Miller. David Miller was also the Screenplay Author. Art Arthur, a well known movie script writer is also listed by the National Archives as a Screenplay Author.

Gene Fowler Jr. became a prolific film and television professional, editing and directing in over a hundred major Hollywood film and television productions. He won four Emmys, an Academy Award (and several nominations), and a Golden Globe during the 1950s through the 1970s. He worked with many well known actors, including Henry Fonda, Clint Eastwood, Michael Landon, and William Holden. Gene Fowler Jr. died in 1998.

David Miller also directed major Hollywood films, from 1941 to 1976.

The film was edited and produced by the Signal Corps Photographic Center (SCPC) in Astoria, New York, at a military facility converted from thirteen buildings originally owned by Paramount Pictures Company, including a sound stage and a complete studio originally built in the 1930s. It was released as part of the Army–Navy Screen Magazine.

== Reception ==
Seeds of Destiny returned more than $200 million for war relief, making it one of the highest-grossing films in motion picture history, and one of the most important historical Academy Award winning films, though few Americans have ever heard of it.

The Oscar Golden Statue for this film is located at the National Museum of the United States Army, Fort Belvoir, VA. (The Signal Corps Photographic Unit won a second Oscar in 1948 for the film Toward Independence, and a nomination for the film Operation Blue Jay. Frank Capra also won an Academy Award for Best Director while in the Signal Corps, but considered that an individual award).

The Academy Film Archive preserved Seeds of Destiny in 2005.

== See also ==
- List of American films of 1946
