= Secondhand World =

2006 novel by Katherine Min

Secondhand World (2006) is the debut novel by Katherine Min.

== Background ==
Min was a Korean American writer from New Hampshire. This was her first novel to be published.

== Plot ==
The story, set in 1976 in Upstate New York, is about Isadora Myung Hee "Isa" Sohn, an 18-year old Korean American teenager. She was named after dancer Isadora Duncan by her immigrant parents..

She survived a house fire that killed her parents. Isa was severely burned over 30% of her body.

As she recovers, Isa retraces events in her family. Her father, a controlling professor of science at a college in Albany, had fought as a soldier in the Korean War and suffered shell shock as a result. Her mother, a former dancer, had burn injuries from a fire that happened when she was a child.

Still, her parents make more effort to be at home in America than their daughter does. Although born and raised in the United States, Isa felt like an outsider as a child. When her younger Stephen dies in an accident at the age of four, Isa feels cut off by her parents' grief for him, as if she were invisible.

Isa was subject to racial bullying as a child. She is the sole student of Korean heritage in her school. In high school she becomes romantically involved with "Hero", a blind albino boy who is also an outsider.

She has long felt more comfortable at her friend Rachel's house, whose family is more easy going than hers. Rachel and Hero convince her to run away with them and they head to California. They are discovered and returned home.

Isa sees her mother kissing her college professor, with whom she had been studying poetry. Her mother was romantically involved with a college professor and was unfaithful to her husband. Upon learning of the affair, Isa informs her father.

She later learns that her mother had set the fire in an act of murder-suicide. Coming across her father's journal convinces her that he was emotionally devastated by her mother's affair, but could not have set the fire. Isa ultimately forgives her parents and others who have wronged her.

== Reception ==
Writer Christine Thomas, in the Chicago Tribune, stated that Isa has "detachment" and "is rigidly portrayed as separate", while Isa's parents show leniency toward Isa and "embrace American life".

== Reception ==
Deborah Vankin of the Los Angeles Times described it as "A pretty novel with something to say". She argued that the storyline is "worthwhile" though she argued the story is "disjointed" with the book being "simply about too much" with "external situations" being "forced". Vankin described the book as "Rick Moody’s “The Ice Storm” meets a vintage version of “Crash.”"

Kirkus Reviews states that Min used "stringent attention and honesty" in crafting the characters and setting.

Publishers Weekly stated that Min had been "spot-on" in demonstrating "an outsider family's tight-knit alienation". PW stated that the storyline "lurches and meanders".

== See also ==
- The Fetishist - 2024 novel by Min (published after the author's death)
