= Micro (novel) =

2011 novel by Michael Crichton

- First edition cover
- Author: Michael Crichton; Richard Preston
- Language: English
- Genre: Science fiction, Adventure, techno-thriller
- Publisher: HarperCollins
- Publication date: November 22, 2011
- Publication place: United States
- Pages: 424
- ISBN: 978-0-06-087302-8
- Preceded by: Pirate Latitudes
- Followed by: Dragon Teeth

Micro is a techno-thriller novel by Michael Crichton, the seventeenth under his own name and second to be published after his death, published in 2011. Upon his death in 2008, an untitled, unfinished manuscript was found on his computer, which would become Micro. Publisher HarperCollins chose science writer Richard Preston to complete the novel from Crichton's remaining notes and research, and it was finally published in 2011. Micro followed the historical thriller Pirate Latitudes, which was also found on his computer and published posthumously in 2009.

== Plot ==
The narrative begins with a private investigator named Marcos Rodriguez pulling up to a metal building located on the island of Oahu. The building is the main headquarters of Nanigen Micro-Technologies, a research company that specializes in discovering new types of medicine. Disguised as a security guard, Rodriguez enters the unattended building and begins searching the grounds for an unknown object. As he makes his way through the halls of the building, however, he begins to notice mysterious, ultra-fine cuts appearing on his body. Spooked, Rodriguez flees the building.

Shortly after leaving the Nanigen headquarters, Rodriguez makes his way to the office of his employer, Willy Fong. When he arrives, he notices another man, of Chinese descent, waiting in the office. Fong begins to question Rodriguez about his cuts, but before Rodriguez can explain, the Chinese man's throat is slit by an unseen force. Fong and Rodriguez barely have time to react before they are also killed. Their deaths are reported as a triple-suicide, and Lieutenant Dan Watanabe of the Honolulu Police Department is assigned to investigate the case.

In Cambridge, Massachusetts, Harvard graduate student Peter Jansen is collecting venom from a cobra for further experimentation. He is joined in the biology lab by six other graduate students: Rick Hutter, an ethnobotanist; Karen King, an arachnologist; Erika Moll, a coleopterist; Amar Singh, a botanist; Jenny Linn, a biochemist studying pheromones; and Danny Minot, a doctoral student studying the linguistics of science. They are visited by the CEO of Nanigen, Vincent "Vin" Drake, along with his CFO, Alyson Bender, and Peter's brother Eric, who is a vice president at Nanigen. The seven students are recruited by Drake to work with him at a laboratory in Hawaii. Although they are at first reluctant, they all decide to take Drake's offer and fly out to Oahu.

The following morning, Peter receives vague text messages from Eric urging him not to come to Hawaii. Peter tries calling Eric, but gets no response. Shortly afterwards he is called by Bender, who informs Peter that Eric has been in a boating accident and is likely dead. Peter flies to Oahu and meets with Watanabe, who shows him a video of Eric scrambling around the deck of his boat before jumping overboard. Peter notices Bender in the video, observing the scene unfold without a hint of concern on her face.

With assistance from one of Hutter's friends, Peter hacks Nanigen's phone records and finds a cryptic exchange between Bender and Drake, which confirm his suspicions about Eric's death. He saves the conversation onto a drive and plans to play it out loud during the students' scheduled tour of Nanigen in order to expose Drake. When the tour commences, Peter sneaks away from the group to find a place to insert the drive, stealing a wireless microphone while doing so and hiding it in his shirt. However, Drake catches Peter and takes him into another room where he beats him. Drake confesses that he did set up Eric to be killed on the boat. He then realizes that Peter had a microphone hidden in his pocket and that the other graduate students heard everything.

Drake activates an emergency alarm and drags Peter into the room where the rest of the graduate students are waiting. He orders them to follow him, with Bender in tow. He leads them to the tensor generator, a machine that uses extreme magnetic fields to shrink anything, even living organisms. Drake rushes the seven students inside, along with the generator's operator, Jarel Kinsky (the only other person in the room) and shrinks them all down to half an inch in height. As the disoriented subjects adjust to their new micro-surroundings, Drake places them into a plastic bag and takes them into another room, where a snake is being held. He drops Peter inside the snake's tank and leaves.

Before the snake can eat Peter, the other students save him by using wasp pheromone to cover Peter's scent and spider thread to pull him out. Bender, knowing that Drake will not stop until the students are dead, hides them and Kinsky inside a paper bag. When Drake returns, she insists that they escaped and are hiding in the room. As Drake orders the room to be gassed, Bender leaves with the bag and drives to Nanigen's arboretum. However, Drake realizes that Bender has misled him and follows her there, where he confronts her about the bag. Bender admits that she hid the students, and Drake feigns understanding of her concerns before sending her into the forest to kill them. As she walks into the trees, however, King uses her knife to cut open the bag, causing everyone in the bag to fall out. Realizing Bender betrayed him after she admits helping the shrunken students escape, Drake kills her.

Kinsky tells the students about supply stations, shrunken bases where shrunken Nanigen staff can observe safely. However, Kinsky is killed after getting too close to an ant colony by ant "guards". The remaining seven get to the first supply base, but their base and all the others are being removed on Drake's orders by Don Makele, the Nanigen security chief, who spots them and reports it to Drake.

Soon after, Jenny drowns when Danny, who at first tries to help her, instead releases her hand in a panic and watches her slip under, having been afraid that she would have pulled him in with her causing him to drown as well. Only Jenny sees his treachery before she dies.

Meanwhile, Drake shrinks two Nanigen security members, and tasks them to find and kill the students in the forest, if they have not died already, claiming that the students were attempting industrial espionage. The students, though, adjust well to the micro-world, and utilize their scientific expertise to survive and outwit dangerous insects. When the assassins track them down, they manage to kill Amar and Peter before the students kill them in self-defense. They steal the assassins' shrunken vehicle, and head for the last Nanigen base they know about from which they might fly back to the Tensor generator. Unknown to Drake, or anyone else, Eric, Peter's brother, is still alive and is searching for the graduate students.

After Erika is killed by birds, the three remaining students reach the Tantalus Nanigen base, but find no miniature airplanes. They encounter a fugitive Ben Rourke, the inventor of the Tensor generator, and also hunted by Drake, who has managed to adapt and survive in the micro-world. He gives them urgent medical attention and offers them three miniature planes that he has repaired. He explains that he has learned to survive the "microbends", a fatal sickness that afflicts shrunken humans. Danny, panicking due to larvae laid in his arm by a wasp, betrays the group by contacting Drake and offering him Rourke's "microbends" remedy in return for his hospitalization and safety. He steals a micro-plane to meet Drake but is killed when his plane is attacked by bats. The next morning, the students, now only Rick and Karen, escape from Rourke's base in the remaining planes as Drake torches the Tantalus base, apparently killing Rourke. They find Eric, who leads them back to Nanigen's headquarters.

Meanwhile, Makele confesses to the local police force that he is complicit in Nanigen's and Drake's crimes, and a police force is sent to Nanigen to arrest Drake. Eric and the students arrive at Nanigen first and encounter Drake, who activates micro-bots to attack Eric and a fight ensues. The two students finally re-enter the Tensor generator and return to full size. A micro-bot that attempted to attack them is enlarged as well, to the size "of a refrigerator". In the fighting, Drake is trapped in the Tensor generator room and is attacked by his own micro-bots, as well as the enlarged micro-bot, while the full-size Karen and Rick rescue an injured Eric. After Drake is killed, the enlarged micro-bot destroys the room and Tensor generator, though a business partner of Drake's, Edward Catel, makes off with a disc containing information on the Tensor generator, intending to sell it off. The police finally arrive.

The two surviving students fall in love. Karen plans to return to the micro-world, enraptured by the beauty and diversity of life.

== Writing ==
Michael Crichton spoke about working on Micro in three interviews before his death. He described the project as "an adventure story like Jurassic Park. I'm enjoying myself," and said the novel "would be informative in a way that would be fun, and would give... some information about how our environment really is structured."

The book includes a somewhat detailed sketch of the setting in which the story takes place, titled "The Pali". Near the base of the waterfall in the sketch, reads the small inscription "NUMQUAM OBLIVISCEMUR MICHAELIS CRICHTONIS", which translated from Latin, reads: "We shall never forget Michael Crichton".

== Film adaptation ==
On June 26, 2015, DreamWorks announced plans for a film adaptation of Micro. Frank Marshall will produce the film, while Sherri Crichton and Laurent Bouzereau will act as executive producers. Steven Spielberg is developing the film with DreamWorks. In April 2017, Joachim Rønning was attached to direct the film, with a script by Darren Lemke. In October 2018, Neil Widener and Gavin James were brought on to write a new screenplay for the film.
