= Sergei Kourdakov =

Russian-American KGB agent

- Kourdakov, c. 1972
- Born: Sergei Nicholaevich Kourdakov; Сергей Николаевич Курдаков; March 1, 1951; Novosibirsk Oblast, Soviet Union
- Died: January 1, 1973 (aged 21); Running Springs, California, U.S.
- Resting place: Rock Creek Cemetery; Washington, D.C., U.S.
- Occupations: KGB agent; naval officer; writer
- Known for: Defection to Canada, The Persecutor

Sergei Nikolayevich Kourdakov (Russian: Сергей Николаевич Курдаков; March 1, 1951 – January 1, 1973) was a self described former KGB agent and Soviet Navy officer who from his late teens allegedly carried out more than 150 raids in underground Christian communities in regions of the Soviet Union in the 1960s. At the age of twenty, he defected to Canada while a naval officer by jumping from a Naval trawler into the Pacific. Kourdakov swam ashore to Haida Gwaii, and converted to Evangelical Christianity. He is known for having written The Persecutor (also known as Forgive Me, Natasha), an autobiography that was written shortly before his death in 1973 and published posthumously. Since its publication, it has been the source of varied criticism. After the collapse of the Soviet Union, Caroline Walker, an American Evangelical Christian journalist and filmmaker who hoped to adapt The Persecutor for the big screen, travelled to the Russian Federation and attempted to confirm the memoir of Kourdakov. Instead, Walker's interviews with Russians who had known Kourdakov before his defection exposed that The Persecutor was a work of fiction; made up first in order to be granted political asylum in Canada and then repeated incessantly and written down in order to build a financially lucrative career as an Evangelical author and public speaker in the West. A documentary film, produced by Damian Wojciechowski, followed Caroline Walker during and after her research trip to Russia, Forgive Me, Sergei, won numerous awards worldwide.

== The Persecutor ==
According to The Persecutor Sergei Kourdakov was born on March 1, 1951, in Novosibirsk Oblast, Soviet Union. His father Nikolai Ivanovich Kourdakov was a soldier in the Soviet Army and a political activist who was a very loyal supporter of Joseph Stalin. He led a brigade in the Winter War and led a unit under General Konstantin Rokossovsky in World War II. After the war, Nikolai helped set up a military base and became the base chief. Although Sergei was told that his father died by being shot, he found out much later from a friend of his father's that when Nikita Khrushchev became Premier of the Soviet Union, he had ordered the elimination of important officers who had supported Stalin in order to consolidate his power, and that Nikolai Kourdakov had been one of them. Sergei lived with his mother until her health began to deteriorate and when he was four years old, she became very ill and died. He was invited to live with a family who had known his mother. It was there that he learned to read and count. Sergei got along well with everyone in the family except with their son Andrei, whom he believed to be mentally handicapped. At the age of six, he decided to run away after Andrei tried to kill him by shoving his head into a filled bathtub.

For ten days, he lived in Novosibirsk, thieving from food stands until he was caught and sent to the police. He was promptly sent to an orphanage then known as Children's Home Number One, where he joined the Octobrianiks, a Soviet youth organization required for all children grades one through three. After three years, he was transferred to an orphanage for older children forty miles away in Verkh-Irmen. There he joined Youth Pioneers, the Communist youth organization required for children nine through fifteen. Sergei also joined a gang that turned into a reign of terror for the city. In response to this looming threat, the police ordered the orphanage to be shut down in 1961 and all the children separated to different orphanages.

=== Barysevo orphanage ===
Sergei then went back to Novosibirsk to once again live in the train station and steal from the food stalls. Eventually he was caught and sent to another orphanage, this one in Baryshevo. He later said that living in that orphanage had been a turning point in his life. In his autobiography, he wrote "An atmosphere of fear prevailed throughout the home. We were afraid of the aunts and uncles (orphanage employees). They were afraid of Big Irene and Uncle Nichy, who, in turn were afraid of the party leaders. Barysevo became a camp of hate and fear, divided between the wardens and the children."

He soon discovered that the orphanage at Barysevo had a caste system-esque society created by the orphans, with "slaves" on the bottom, "lieutenants" in the middle, and the "king" at the top. Starting off as a slave, he soon challenged a lieutenant and won his position. By the time he was fourteen years old, he became king, replacing his friend Nikolai who was transferred to a different orphanage. As king, he met a thirteen-year-old boy whose parents were declared unfit to be parents due to their religious beliefs. Due to the boy's own Christian beliefs, he was nicknamed "the Deacon". Sergei soon befriended him and ordered any teasing towards him to stop.

=== Interest in communism ===
At the age of fifteen, Sergei Kourdakov joined Komsomol, also known as the Communist Union of Youth. The director of the school he attended, known as Comrade Skripko, saw interest in him and had convinced him to join. Sergei cultivated a great interest in Marxism-Leninism, one that was not particularly shared with his friends in his orphanage. During high school, he was also excelling in all of his school subjects and learned to speak German. The school director eventually offered him the opportunity to lecture younger classes about on various subjects, generally subjects having to do with communism.

In the summer of 1965, Kourdakov and two close friends of his obtained a large amount of hashish from Turkestan and began a narcotics business. Initially successful, his business ended after a group of gang members that discovered he was carrying the narcotic took him into an alley and stabbed him in the back for it, almost killing him. While recovering from his injury, Sergei realized that he had to make a decision for what he would do with his life: either follow the course of his friends and continue dealing in the underworld or seriously focus on building a career in communism. He chose communism.

By this time Sergei Kourdakov had already become the leader of the Communist Youth League of his area. He graduated from his school in June 1967 and was awarded a silver medal for being the second best student in his grade level. For much of the last year of school, he focused on pushing and improving the League as much as he could, hoping to make it the most successful one in his district, a position that was indeed awarded to it during the judging of Leagues, which happened annually.

=== Post-school ===
After graduating school, Kourdakov faced the decision on what career path to take for his military obligation and chose the Navy. With high honors and grades, and an outstanding recommendation from his old school director, he applied to and was accepted into the Alexander Popov Naval Academy in Leningrad. Although a newcomer, he was chosen to be the leader of the school's Communist youth organization due to the record of his leadership in his previous organization. At the academy, Kourdakov met Pavel Sigorsky, a Pole who taught him Polish. After completing a year of study at the academy in July 1968, he continued his studies at the Petropavlovsk Naval Academy in Kamchatka, at the Eastern border of Russia.

Before going to the academy and during his military summer vacation, he traveled again to Novosibirsk to visit his old friends, who were all involved in gangs. Shortly after attending a peace conference he was invited to between a gang his friends were in and another nearby gang, Kourdakov was shot in the left breast in revenge by a member of the other gang. Miraculously, he survived because the bullet first shot through multiple layers of clothes and through his thick address book and all of his identification papers before lodging itself in his skin.

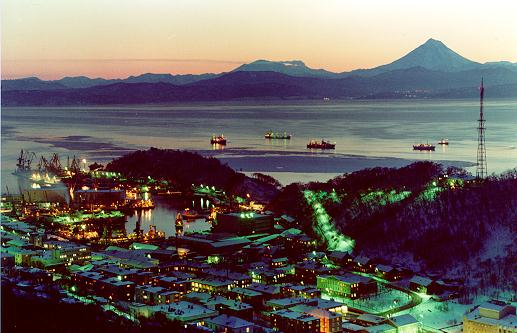
Petropavlovsk, the city Sergei Kourdakov lived in while studying at the Petropavlovsk Naval Academy and leading over a hundred raids against Christians.

Before going to the naval academy, Sergei Kourdakov spent two weeks in Blagoveshchensk, a city that borders China, serving in a naval military unit against the Chinese army. At one point he partook in a small battle. Finally in late September 1968, he arrived at the port city Petropavlovsk. Again, because of his past experience and record, he was chosen to be the leader of the academy's Communist Youth League. From then on, along with his studies, he was in charge of carrying out orders sent from the Komsomol headquarters in Moscow, listening to the grievances of cadets and argue in favor of them if he was convinced the cadet was right, and discipline any cadet who appeared to be undermining Communist commitments, often shocking them into performing better. In just that single year at the academy, Kourdakov served as the League leader, performed well in his studies, organized entertainment events for the cadets, lectured at nearby schools on many current events topics, and competed in all of the sports offered by the academy.

=== As a KGB agent ===
While working at his Communist Youth League office in May 1969, Sergei Kourdakov was visited by Ivan Azarov, a well-known KGB official. He came to tell him about a "special-action squad" he was forming as an official but secret branch of the city's police. After telling Kourdakov that he had gone through his record all the way to his days in Children's Home Number One and complimented him on his ability to captivate people so well during speeches, he stated his desire to place him as the leader of this new group. Although Sergei tried thinking of reasons to reject the offer while Azarov was telling him all this, he immediately reconciled after hearing the pay he was to receive for each operation—twenty-five rubles. At the time he received seven rubles per month as a naval cadet and if he were to become an officer in the Navy, he would still only receive seventy rubles per month.

One of the main duties of being the leader of this organization was to pick the best men from the academy to work in the organization, usually consisting of about fifty men. Kourdakov later wrote that he assumed that with this "special-action squad," he would be dealing with "drunks, murderers, wife beaters, and other lawbreakers the regular police couldn't take time to deal with." And true to his assumptions, that was what he and his team were assigned to deal with. For the most part, they would be sent to bars and clubs to break up fights.

But after a few operations, the group was told that their abilities would be put to a different use, breaking up or raiding secret Christian home worship services. Under the leadership and influence of Ivan Azarov, Kourdakov and the others in his group became convinced that Christians, "Believers" as they were always referred to, were a serious threat to the Communist party and the Soviet Union. Aside from "roughing up" the members of a service, they were also instructed to arrest the leaders of the group and confiscate any Bibles and other religious texts. Sometimes they were told to arrest every participant.

=== Christian persecutions ===
The first of these operations, as Kourdakov puts it, ended in disaster. When they arrived at the house where the meeting was, none of the members put up a fight, leaving the group in a very awkward and uncomfortable position. For a while from then on, the group received mostly orders to break up more fights. The squad's first major operation was in small village called Elizovo, near the Avacha River and 35 miles to the north of Petropavlovsk, where a baptism service was being held. Clubs in hand, the group hid in nearby bushes preparing for the Believers to arrive. Soon after they had finished the baptisms, the squad sprung into action. In just five minutes, all of the Believers were knocked down to the ground, all of them bleeding in one way or another. One girl's ear had been split open, and the group's pastor lay dead and floating down the river. As further torture and humiliation, the bleeding young girls of the group were stripped naked and driven in that state to the police station, an act greatly disapproved of by Ivan Azarov because everything conducted by the squad needed to be done in secret, and that doing something like that could turn the people against the police.

Many of these raids continued in similar fashions [May-Dec. 1970]. The leaders of the worship groups were usually arrested and sentenced to many years in Siberian labor camps. Along with the duties of being the leader of the police group, Sergei Kourdakov continued studying at the naval academy, hoping to become a radio engineer in the Navy. He still retained his position as the leader of the academy's Communist Youth League and continued to compete in the school's sports, primarily consisting of wrestling, judo, karate, and track.

Any religious writings found during raids were confiscated. Any printed materials, including bibles, were sent to Moscow where they were studied and analyzed. In his book, Kourdakov quoted Azarov on the use of printed material: "Another organization and department branch has been established in Moscow to study the teachings of these Believers, so we can better oppose and defeat them. There our finest scholars are studying their literature, including their Bible, in order that they can learn how to better fight their religious beliefs. It's sort of a complete and full-scale Bible college." Another one of Sergei's duties as leader of the squad was getting rid of other religious texts, specifically the handwritten or very old materials, which were usually used to heat furnaces.

The group was able to determine where Believer meetings were happening before they began through use of spies in the networks of underground churches throughout the region. These people were paid much more than Kourdakov and his men because if they attended a meeting that was going to be raided, they would end up being beaten as much as the Believers. Another part of Kourdakov's job was to prepare reports and record the names of all of the Believers caught, to be entered into a nationwide database in Moscow. Sergei later wrote that "In addition, a three-by-five-inch card with the Believer's picture, birth date, and other data was sent to the police station. These cards were kept in a special file. Any time the party chose, the Believers could be rounded up and removed from society quickly."

=== Meeting Natasha ===
During one of these raids, Kourdakov took particular notice of one of the Believers, Natasha Zhdanova, whom he at the time saw as particularly attractive. At that particular raid, one of the squad's members Victor Matveyev had smashed her against a wall. Sergei had usually assumed that Believers, especially younger ones, would distance themselves greatly from Christian meetings after experiencing the wrath of his group. But only three days later, he found her at another meeting. This time he decided to take matters into his own hands, delivering a very severe beating. After reading her records and discovering that she had been part of the Communist Youth League, Kourdakov saw it as his duty to set her straight and had her come to the police station to have a talk with her, in hopes of frightening her into breaking off from the underground Christian church. But only one week later, during yet another meeting, they found her again. Alex Gulyaev, another member of the squad, moved to attack her with his club, when Victor jumped between them. When Alex demanded that he get out of the way, Victor said, "Alex, I'm telling you, don't touch her! Nobody touches her! [...] She has something we don't have! Nobody touches her! Nobody!" The raid ended abruptly as all of the meeting's members were sent out. Natasha Zhdanova's name was later used in the alternate title for Sergei Kourdakov's autobiography The Persecutor, which was also published as Forgive Me, Natasha.

On April 22, 1970, Sergei Kourdakov attended a live televised major Communist party convention to celebrate the 100th birthday of Vladimir Lenin and honor the future leaders of the party. He was invited to receive an award which honored him as the Number-One Communist Youth of Kamchatka Province, for which he prepared and gave a fifteen-minute speech, which was broadcast nationwide. There he met Comrade Orlov, the party leader for Kamchatka. During the banquet following the convention, Orlov, drunk with vodka, invited him into the private dining room reserved for party leaders. What waited inside shocked Kourdakov. Inside he saw all sorts of expensive delicacies he did not expect to see and vodka "flowing like water," but more importantly, he witnessed the state of the party leaders—drunk, passed out, or drinking themselves to unconsciousness. Many of them had their faces in their food and one was lying on the food serving tray. Comrade Orlov had excused himself and when he came back, continued drinking. Soon, he began criticizing Joseph Stalin, Leonid Brezhnev, and eventually communism itself, at one point shouting that "Communism is the worst curse that has ever come to man!" This was a turning point in Sergei's life. He later wrote that he had been a genuine and firm believer in communism. But after witnessing the hypocrisy of those top party leaders, his goal in life had changed: "From now on, there was only one goal: Get to the top! If the game was played by cynicism and ruthlessness, I'd play it that way."

By mid-1970, Sergei Kourdakov was beginning to notice new patterns in the ways the Believers worshiped. Although they usually split into groups of around fifteen, they began meeting in groups of ten or less, which required Sergei's group to perform more raids in order to have as much of an effect on the Believers. He also began to notice an increase in Believers, which made it seem to him that the bigger the fight they put up, the larger they grew. Soon the group was operating on a tight schedule instead of just being called in whenever they were needed. Another trend he noticed was that may of the new Believers were young people, often as young as him. This made little sense to him, as he had a hard time understanding how Christianity could appeal to young people so much. With all of these operations occurring, news of the group began to spread throughout the public.

=== Exposure to the Gospel of Luke ===
By July 1970, the group had accumulated many handwritten religious texts. On one particular day, the police captain Dimitri Nikiforov asked Kourdakov and Matveyev to go to the basement of the police station and burn some of the texts for heat. While Victor left to get some vodka for themselves, Sergei sat down there trying to figure out what "young people see in this trash." As he thought of Natasha, a sense of curiosity overcame him and he picked up a text, which happened to be an incomplete copy of the Gospel of Luke and began reading until Victor came back. Kourdakov later wrote in his autobiography about his experience when reading the book for the first time:

At the first opportunity I had, lying in my bunk at the naval academy, I opened up those pieces of paper and began to read them again. Jesus was talking and teaching someone how to pray. I became more curious and read on. This certainly was no anti-state material. It was how to be a better person and how to forgive those who do you wrong. Suddenly the words leaped out of those pages and into my heart. I read on, engrossed in the kind words of Jesus. This was exactly the opposite of what I had expected. My lack of understanding, which had been like blinders on my eyes, left me right then, and the words bit deeply into my being. [...] Through the days and weeks ahead, those words of Jesus stayed with me. I couldn't shake them, hard as I tried. I wished I hadn't read them. Everything had been so organized in my life, but those disturbing words had changed something. I had feelings I never had felt before. I couldn't explain or understand them.

— Sergei Kourdakov, The Persecutor

In late July 1970, Kourdakov was sent to Novosibirsk for military duty. Although he was to stay in Novosibirsk in case of a military emergency, he took a plane to Moscow to visit the tomb of Vladimir Lenin for the second time, hoping that being near his body would give him a sense of direction, something the corpse fell short on. Leaving the tomb that day, Sergei made his decision. He would leave Russia. He soon formulated a plan that would involve him swimming across the Tisza river to Hungary using an aqua-lung he acquired at a black market. He even went as far as obtaining Hungarian currency and making his way to the border, but after seeing the immense amount of security at the border, he quickly realized that it would be impossible. With his military leave ending, Kourdakov flew back to Petropavlovsk. Soon enough he was back to conducting raids against the Believers' meetings. He later wrote that because he was dissatisfied and ill at ease at the time, the last raids he led were the most vicious.

During one particularly large raid, Sergei suddenly became emotionally grieved and left in the middle of the raid. On that day he decided to quit working for the KGB and from then on began giving excuses when told to gather up men to perform raids. Eventually he was relieved of his duties and continued as leader of the academy's Youth Organization. To persuade him to stay, Dimitri Nikiforov offered to place him in the Tomsk Academy, a well-known school for KGB agents. Kourdakov rejected it.

=== In the Navy ===
In January 1971, Kourdakov graduated from the Petropavlovsk Naval Academy as a radio officer and was assigned to duty on a Soviet Navy destroyer. After more than a month on the destroyer, Sergei was sent back to the naval base for two weeks. There, he asked to be transferred to a ship near the United States coast, a request that was approved. On March 4, 1971, Sergei Kourdakov left the Soviet Union for the last time to board a Soviet submarine. A few months later on June 25, Kourdakov was transferred to the Soviet trawler Ivan Sereda, which was in need of a radio officer.

On the Ivan Sereda, Kourdakov began making preparations to defect to America. He constructed a makeshift raft and hid food and water provisions for his escape. Soon the trawler was close enough to Los Angeles so that the city's lights could be seen on the horizon. Kourdakov planned escape that night, but had to perform one more shift as a radio officer before sunset. On that shift, he received a message that greatly hindered that plan. A fisherman named Simas Kudirka had jumped off from a Russian ship and made it to an American ship off the coast of New England (see The Kudirka incident). From that message, he learned that the United States government fully cooperated with the Soviet Union and handed him back to his home country, where he was sentenced to ten years in prison. Realizing the fate that could lie ahead of him if he chose to venture into America, he decided to try to escape to Canada instead.

=== Defecting to Canada ===
A few weeks later, Sergei Kourdakov was transferred to another trawler, the Kolivan, which was traveling North towards the Canadian coast. While off the coast of Vancouver, he was again transferred to another ship, the Shturman Elagin, which was headed towards Amchitka Island. During his months at sea, Sergei often secretly listened to Russian broadcasts of Voice of America as well as religious broadcasts. He also spent many hours each day exercising in preparation of his escape.

By late August 1971, the Elagin began heading back to the Canadian coast. A few days later, Kourdakov received a message saying that he was to be transferred to the Maria Ulyanova in five days, which would then head back to the Soviet Union. Desperately, Sergei Kourdakov tried thinking of a good escape strategy. During those five days, the ship encountered a severe storm, and the captain ordered him to radio Canadian authorities and request to enter Canadian waters in order to avoid the storm. Sergei quickly realized this would be his very last opportunity. On September 3, 1971, around 10 pm, Kourdakov plunged into Canadian waters.

In the morning of the next day, Sergei Kourdakov was found staggering half-naked and bleeding onto the shores of Haida Gwaii by a woman living near the sea, who quickly called the hospital. Suffering from a cardiac irregularity, he wasn't sure at first whether he was back on a Soviet ship or in Canada. By the time he was at the hospital, he had entered a deep sleep. When he woke up, he was greeted by a translator. Later that day he was flown to Prince Rupert, British Columbia, where he stayed in the prison section of a hospital. Because no one in the hospital spoke Russian, he communicated in German.

I was kept there for several days and given the very best: wonderful food, rest, and the finest of medical care. Everybody was wonderful to me. I was the center of attention and though I couldn't understand their language, I understood that not too many Russian seaman come to Prince Rupert!

— Sergei Kourdakov, The Persecutor

On one particular day, an immigration officer offered to give Sergei Kourdakov a tour of Prince Rupert. Kourdakov was so amazed with the city that he stated later that his "eyes almost popped out as I looked at the cars and nice homes. I guess I was staring at them." Being very skeptical, Sergei did not rule out the possibility of the trip being a propaganda tour.

Just as Kourdakov began looking ahead to the bright future, he was given disturbing news that he might be handed back to the Soviet government. Canada was conducting trade agreement with the Soviet Union, and his staying there could hinder relations between the two countries. In addition, Soviet Union Premier Alexei Kosygin was visiting Canada and the government didn't want to offend him. He was subsequently flown to Vancouver and placed in the Vancouver Central Jail. Alone in his cell, Sergei began rethinking his decision to attempt to defect to Canada instead of America. He tried talking to God, although he felt embarrassed because he didn't know any prayers.

In the middle of the night one day, Kourdakov was taken on a "tour of the city" which led him to an airport, where he was boarded on a plane that flew to Montreal. From there he was taken to a prison on an island on the Saint Lawrence River in Quebec City. This was done in preparation for potentially deporting Kourdakov, since a Russian liner was set to travel up the Saint Lawrence River and dock only a few hundred yards from the prison.

As soon as Sergei Kourdakov was whisked away in the night, Canadian radio talk show host Pat Burns, who had taken interest in Sergei and had broadcast his case on the radio, was informed of all of this. While on the air, he called Member of Parliament Harold Edward Winch and explained Kourdakov's situation. Subsequently, Winch demanded a public statement regarding Kourdakov from Prime Minister Pierre Trudeau.

With my plight now public knowledge, the authorities couldn't give me back and my danger was past. I never did learn how much danger I actually was in or whether or not I would have been handed back. But, to me at least, the danger had seemed very real.

— Sergei Kourdakov, The Persecutor

Soon enough, he was told he could stay in Canada permanently. Although he had to stay in jail for a few more weeks, he was released as soon as his documents were processed.

=== Life in North America ===
While still in jail, Sergei Kourdakov received letters from people all over Canada who had heard his story. He was visited by many people, usually new friends and acquaintances. In addition, he was visited by representatives of the Russian embassy in Canada. They informed him that if he were to come back, they would forgive everything and give him his old position.

As soon as he was released from jail, he had two main intentions: firstly to keep his promise to God and serve Him, and secondly to find a job and settle in Canada. Many people offered to help him, give him a job, or give him a place to live. The first church he went to was Saint Ann's Catholic Church in Quebec. Trying to do the same as others there, he knelt and began praying for three hours.

When he went back to his place of residence, he received a message from someone seeking to hire him, and an address to reach him. He left a note to where he was going to his two Bulgarian friends and translators and went to the interview. But when he went to the address, he found out that it was a set-up and the members were part of the Front de libération du Québec, a nationalist and socialist revolutionary group responsible for hundreds of bombings, with strong Communist ties. According to Kourdakov, they warned him that if he would raise his voice one more time and say things he shouldn't, he would be silenced. As soon as his two friends found his note, they knew it was a trap and rushed there.

I left immediately with them, with the warnings ringing in my ears. I now realized, even here, as a free man, I would still not be left alone. Moscow still was reaching out to me.

— Sergei Kourdakov, The Persecutor

With the strong presence of the FLQ in Quebec and the Russian embassy in Ottawa, Sergei decided to move to Toronto and stay with a Russian family who offered him a place to live. He began studying English at a university in the city. He also went to a church in Toronto which was always open for prayer, where he stayed for two days only praying and drinking water. Sergei also began attending Ukrainian churches in Toronto. With the aid of a pastor, he went through a religious conversion. One day the pastor gave him a small bible printed in Russian. Immediately, he recognized it as the same kind of bible he saw many times during raids in the Soviet Union. When he asked where it came from, the pastor told him that Underground Evangelism (now known as Mission Without Borders), a Californian organization that helped in the smuggling of Christian materials into the Soviet Union and other Communist countries.

While leaving the subway station one day, Kourdakov sensed that he was being followed. When he turned around, he saw three powerfully built Russians who warned him saying, "If you know what is good for you, Kourdakov, you will keep silent and say nothing more. If you open your mouth, you will have a 'final accident.' Remember, you have been warned." He chose not to tell anyone about this at the time because he felt that because of the way he treated Christians in the Soviet Union, he owed it to them to speak out for them now.

If I kept silent, who would speak for them? Who would know of their suffering? I decided that since I took their lives, I owed them a debt. I decided not to tell the authorities of the threat. After all, it was my decision to speak out, and I had to take responsibility for it.

— Sergei Kourdakov, The Persecutor

On May 1, 1972, Kourdakov joined Underground Evangelism and moved to California where he moved in with a family that had heard his story and offered him a place to stay. He spent his time traveling all over the United States speaking in schools, universities, and bible studies about his life and the state of Christian communities in the Soviet Union. He also spent much of his time making live radio broadcasts about Christianity and the evils of Communism in Russian, which were broadcast to the Soviet Union. While living in the United States, Kourdakov spent three weeks in The Pentagon demonstrating how Soviet submarines are made.

== Death ==
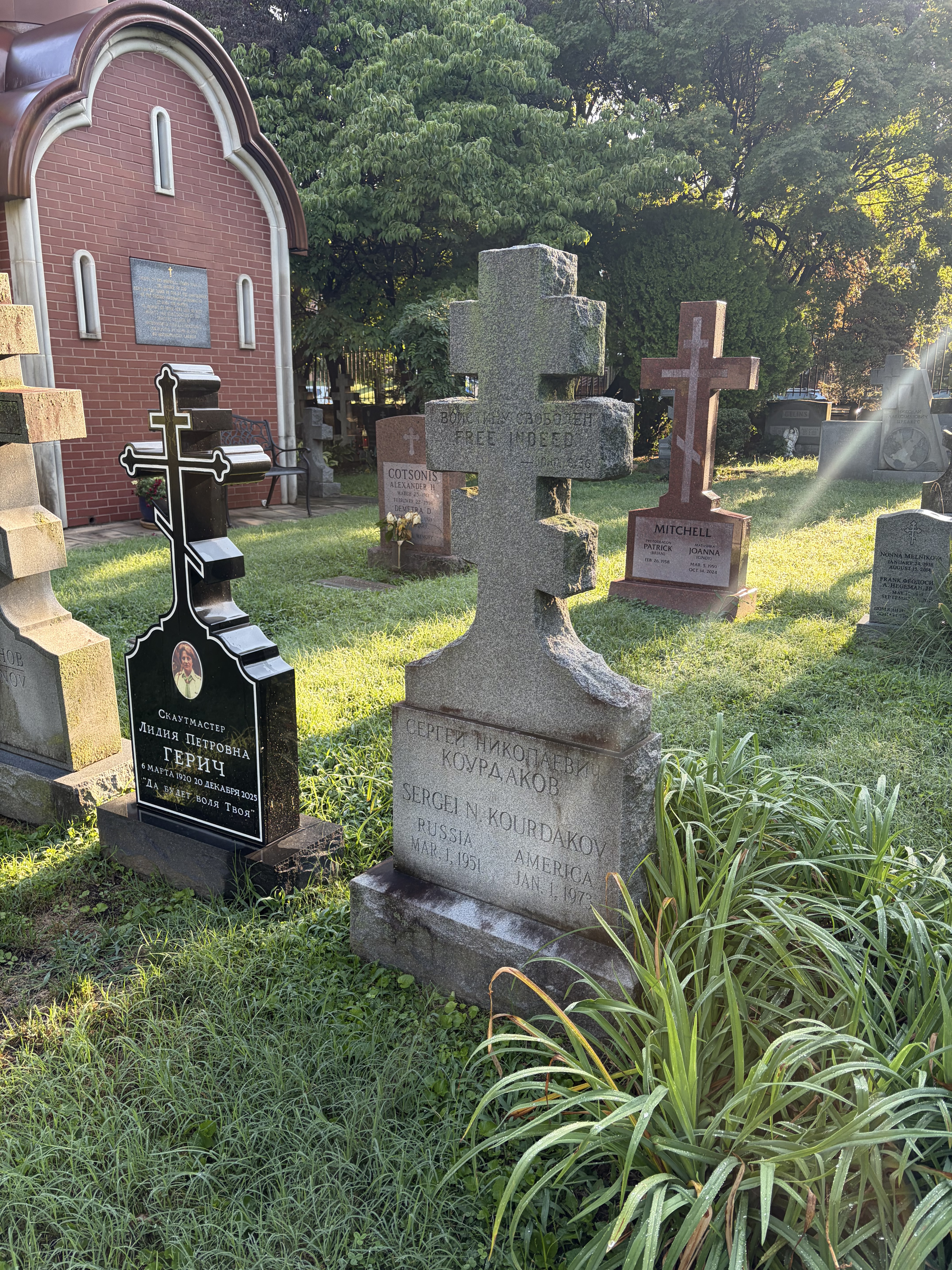
Kourdakov's grave in Rock Creek Cemetery, Washington, D.C.

Sergei Kourdakov's death had been dubbed as "strange and uncertain." Upon moving to California, Kourdakov moved in with a Christian family. Because he began making public appearances so often, he started worrying for his safety, so he began taking a revolver that belonged to the family's father with him whenever he traveled anywhere. To celebrate the New Year, Sergei went on vacation with Ann Johnson, the seventeen-year-old daughter of the family he was living with first to Disneyland, then to a ski lodge in Running Springs, California. On January 1, 1973, Sergei Kourdakov was found dead in his motel room in Running Springs, California, killed by a gunshot to the head. In his room was an unfinished typewritten paper (which he was preparing for Senator Strom Thurmond with regard to receiving permanent residency in the US), a champagne bottle, and the gun borrowed from the family's father.

Due to the circumstances, Sergei Kourdakov was initially announced to have died by suicide. Many, notably Underground Evangelism founder and then-president L. Joe Bass, repudiated this claim. After a more thorough investigation, Kourdakov's death was ruled an accident on March 1, 1973, stating that while Sergei was playing with his revolver, he probably accidentally shot himself. However, due to Kourdakov's status as a former high-rank KGB agent who defected to North America and publicly opposed Communism, some believe that he was assassinated by another KGB member in order to silence him. Sergei himself had considered the possibility of an assassination attempt, hence the revolver, stating that he "was in the Soviet Intelligence. They do not warn twice", and that, if anything were ever to happen to him, "it would have all the appearances of an accident." L. Joe Bass was quoted on an Underground Evangelism newsletter saying that "What better than midnight on New Year's Eve, and what better place than that small, tourist-packed resort area for Sergei Kourdakov to have an 'accident'?"

After his death, his body was sent to Washington, D.C., on January 10, 1973, where an English funeral service by Reverend Richard Halverson, a Presbyterian pastor, and a Russian service at a Russian Orthodox church were held. Sergei Kourdakov was buried in a Russian section of Rock Creek Cemetery in Washington, D.C., United States on January 11, 1973. His headstone gives the spelling of his name in Russian not as Курдаков but as Коурдаков.

== Subsequent controversy ==
Kourdakov's death stirred up much controversy among Christian anti-communist organizations and elsewhere. Jesus to the Communist World general director Richard Wurmbrand, himself a former prisoner and torture victim in Soviet-controlled Romania, accused Underground Evangelism of exploiting the young defector. On January 4, he wrote an open letter to the organization stating that Sergei Kourdakov "should not have been brought on the stage [into publicity] with its perils before having been a member of a church growing in grace and knowledge." Andrew Semenchuk, the west coast representative of the Slavic Gospel Association stated that he and other Russian Baptist church members who heard Sergei speak at a Santa Ana felt that he "should not have been thrust into such a situation—speaking on subjects 'completely beyond him.'"

Some of the criticism towards Underground Evangelism was its alleged exploitation of Kourdakov for profit. According to the Los Angeles Times, by 1973, the young Christian "had become the feature of the organization's literature." In addition to placing Kourdakov on a tour of over twenty speaking engagements during his short time in the organization, Underground Evangelism sold taped versions of his story priced at four dollars. Myrus Knutson, board chairman of Jesus to the Communist World, made a statement saying that "it may be unfair to say it, but they [Underground Evangelism] smelled money."

There have also been some conflicting claims regarding Kourdakov's actual religion. While Sergei Kourdakov identified himself as an Evangelical Christian during his time living in North America to the point of his death, Father Sergius Shukin, an Orthodox priest, claimed that during an interview Kourdakov revealed to him that he was an Orthodox Christian. This claim was first made public in The Orthodox Word nearly two years after Kourdakov's death.

Many claims of The Persecutor were debunked by Caroline Walker, a US Christian journalist, who attempted to document the story of Kourdakov in Russia. Her findings, contrary to her own expectations, revealed that the story was largely a fake. It looked like Sergei Kourdakov made up much of the story to earn political asylum in Canada. The documentary produced by Damian Wojciechowski about Walker's findings, Forgive Me, Sergei won numerous awards worldwide.

== See also ==
- Persecution of Christians in the Soviet Union
- List of KGB defectors
- List of Soviet and Eastern Bloc defectors
- The Persecutor or Forgive Me, Natasha - by Sergei Kourdakov]
