= Dragon Teeth =

Novel by Michael Crichton

- First edition cover
- Author: Michael Crichton
- Cover artist: Will Staehle
- Language: English
- Genre: Adventure, historical fiction
- Publisher: HarperCollins
- Publication date: May 23, 2017
- Publication place: United States
- Pages: 320
- ISBN: 978-0-06-247335-6
- Preceded by: Micro

Dragon Teeth is a novel by Michael Crichton, the eighteenth under his own name and third to be published after his death, written in 1974 and published on May 23, 2017. A historical fiction forerunner to Jurassic Park, the novel is set in the American West in 1876 during the Bone Wars, a period of fervent competition for fossil hunting between two real-life paleontologists noted for their intense rivalry, Othniel Charles Marsh and Edward Drinker Cope. The plot follows the fictional protagonist William Johnson, a Yale student who works during the summer alternately for the two paleontologists.

== Plot ==
William Johnson is a student at Yale college. Reckless and risk-taking, he makes a bet with rival student Marlin that he will go west the following summer. Johnson then attempts to join Prof. Othniel Charles Marsh on his yearly expedition fossil hunting in the Badlands. Marsh is reluctant until Johnson lies, saying that he is a photographer. Johnson learns to take photographs and leaves with Marsh at the appointed time. However, upon learning of Johnson's Philadelphia background, Marsh begins to suspect that he is a spy for Edward Drinker Cope, a rival paleontologist. Marsh abandons Johnson in Cheyenne.

Shortly thereafter, Johnson meets Cope, who invites him to join his expedition. They head out west, despite Marsh's attempts to discredit and stop them. They are finally forced to stop in Fort Benton, when news of Custer's defeat at the hands of Sitting Bull causes a ban on travel into Montana. Even so, Cope's group manages to sneak away from the Fort. When they arrive in the Judith Basin, they immediately begin to dig for fossil bones. They remain there for several months. Marsh attempts to spy on them and poison their water, but leaves after Cope's group lures him into camp and fires at him. Johnson and Cope discover fossil Brontosaurus teeth. At the end of the summer, they leave for Fort Benton. As they have too many bones with them for a single trip, they leave half of the bones at camp, intending to retrieve them on the second trip.

Johnson volunteers to lead the second journey, and is accompanied by a fellow student named Toad, a Snake scout named Little Wind, and the teamster, Cookie. As they approach the camp, they see the fires of the Sioux army in the distance. Cookie and Little Wind desert Johnson and Toad, leaving them with the wagon. They decide to carry on and retrieve the bones anyway, and are pursued by Sioux warriors on horseback. They come across Little Wind, and manage to escape by driving the wagon into the badlands, but Toad is killed in the process. Meanwhile, at Fort Benton, Cookie arrives with several arrows stuck in him, and dies. Cope assumes that Johnson is dead, and telegrams his parents. Johnson and Little Wind drive the Wagon east, hoping to put distance between themselves and the Sioux. Little Wind dies of blood loss. Eventually, Johnson arrives, barely alive, in the town of Deadwood.

Johnson sets up a photography studio to fund stagecoach fare to Fort Laramie. The residents of the Town become convinced that his boxes of bones in fact contain gold. Tensions rise, and, fearing that he will be robbed, Johnson buries the bones. This infuriates a local outlaw named Black Dick Curry, who had been planning to steal the boxes. He challenges Johnson to a duel, which Johnson wins. An injured Curry swears revenge and flees the town.

Johnson raises enough money for the coach and prepares to leave. He offers half of his bones to Wyatt and Morgan Earp in exchange for guarding the coach on its journey, as he suspects that Dick Curry will try to rob it on the way to Laramie. He is proven to be correct, and Dick tries twice to rob the coach, but is unsuccessful. When they arrive in Laramie, Johnson discovers that Wyatt made a deal with Marsh to sell half of Johnson's bones. While they bargain, Johnson removes the bones from the boxes and replaces them with rocks. Johnson then continues on to Cheyenne, and eventually arrives back in Philadelphia, much to the surprise of his parents and of Cope. He turns the bones over to Cope. Finally, he returns to Yale to claim his winnings from Marlin.

== Historical characters ==
- Edward Drinker Cope
- Othniel Charles Marsh
- Wyatt Earp
- Morgan Earp
- Charles Hazelius Sternberg
- Wild Bill Hickok
- Calamity Jane
- Collis Huntington
- Robert Louis Stevenson

== Adaptation ==
On July 30, 2016, prior to the novel's publication, it was announced that National Geographic closed a development deal with Amblin Television to adapt the novel into a limited global television series. It was to be adapted by Graham Yost and Bruce C. McKenna, set to follow the notorious rivalry between real-life paleontologists Edward Drinker Cope and Othniel Charles Marsh during a time of intense fossil speculation and discovery. However, the project has not moved forward and is considered to be in development limbo or canceled. It was originally announced as a major miniseries event in 2016, but production has never materialized.

== Reception ==
Don Oldenburg of USA Today gave the novel four stars, describing the book as "Plain and simple, it's Crichton fiction — a fun, suspenseful, entertaining, well-told tale filled with plot twists, false leads and lurking danger in every cliffhanging chapter." Kirkus Reviews praised the book as a "fun read," but stated that it fell short of Crichton's previous works.
