= Today Is Tonight =

Novel by Jean Harlow

- First paperback edition cover
- Author: Jean Harlow
- Language: English
- Publisher: Grove Press (h/b); Dell Publishing (p/b)
- Publication date: 1965 (written c.1934-37)
- Publication place: United States
- Media type: Print (Paperback)

Today Is Tonight is a novel written by Hollywood actress Jean Harlow in the mid-1930s but not published until 1965.

== Publication ==
Harlow's friend Ruth Luise Hamp inherited the rights to the unpublished manuscript, Today Is Tonight, when Harlow's mother died, and then published the novel. The film critic Ezra Goodman wrote the introduction. Harlow's agent, Arthur Landau, wrote the foreword.

According to Landau, in his foreword to the novel, Harlow had expressed interest in writing a novel as early as 1933–1934 and completed a manuscript before her death in 1937. During her life, Harlow's stepfather Marino Bello shopped the unpublished manuscript around to a few studios. Louis B. Mayer had prevented the book from being sold by putting an injunction on it, using a clause in Harlow's contract that her services as an artist can't be used without MGM's permission. After her death, Landau writes, her mother sold the film rights to Metro-Goldwyn-Mayer and retained the publication rights, but no film was made and the novel itself remained unpublished until the mid-1960s.

It was published in condensed form in the July 1965 issue of Mademoiselle, in hardcover in July 1965 by Grove Press, and in paperback later in 1965 by Dell Publishing. At the time of publication, press coverage stated that the screenwriter Carey Wilson assisted Harlow with the book.

The novel is set in the 1920s, amongst the opulent living of the Hollywood wealthy elite, and focuses on one couple, Peter and Judy Lansdowne.

== Reception ==
In 2013 English writer and humourist Cassandra Parkin reviewed the novel on her blog as part of her series "Adventures in Trash". In her review she listed the novel's many faults, including logical inconsistencies – such as when the heroine convinces her blind husband that day is night and night is day in order to conceal her job as a nude model (from the article: "Because blind people don’t have Circadian rhythms, or hearing, or the ability to sense changes in temperature, or brains, or anything at all really, and are basically just useless lumps of animated carbon sitting around eating and taking up space until they die.") – poor plotting, Mary Sue characterisation, and bizarre departures from the story into rambles on subjects like philosophy (from the novel: "If I had a stenographer to take down what I was thinking, it would be an awful lesson to George Bernard Shaw.").

However, despite confessing that "it’s utter, utter nonsense", Parkin "adore[s] it", writing: "however ridiculous this book is, it’s also charming – in the way writing often is when it’s written in a breathless rush and without any thought for what anyone will make of it". She also praises the contemporary detail ("There are lots of things I love about this fantastically odd novel, but one of my favourite things has got to be the quirky little glimpses it gives into the time it comes from"), such as the focus on knees, skin, and shaved armpits as signifiers of female beauty.
