= The Light at the Edge of the World =

1971 adventure film directed by Kevin Billington

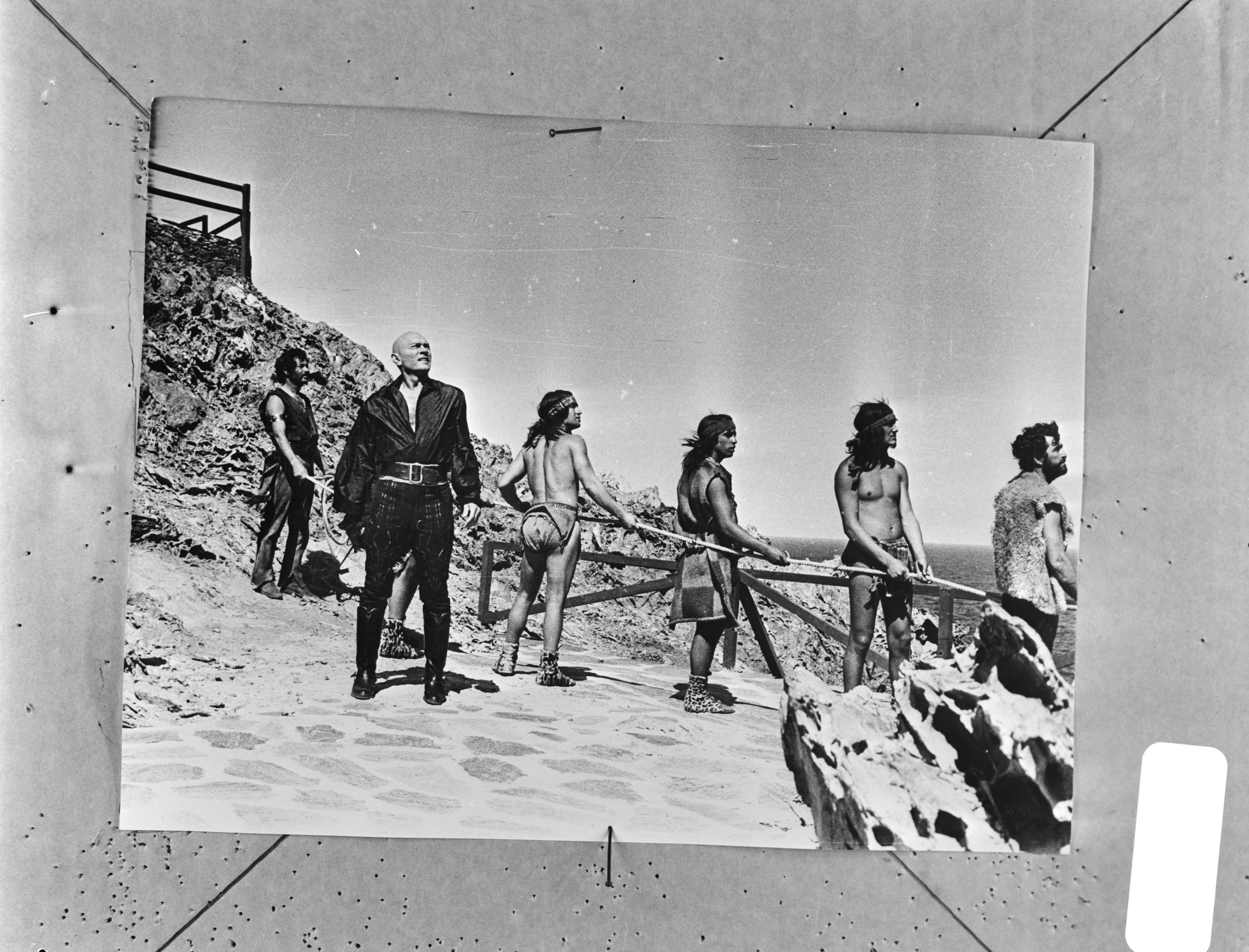
- Brynner and others on the set of the film
- Directed by: Kevin Billington
- Written by: Tom Rowe; Rachel Billington (additional dialogue)
- Based on: The Lighthouse at the End of the World by Jules Verne
- Produced by: Kirk Douglas
- Starring: Yul Brynner; Kirk Douglas; Samantha Eggar; Fernando Rey; Massimo Ranieri; Renato Salvatori; Jean-Claude Drouot; Víctor Israel
- Cinematography: Cecilio Paniagua; Henri Decaë
- Edited by: Bert Bates
- Music by: Piero Piccioni
- Production companies: The Bryna Company; Jet Films; Triumfilms
- Distributed by: National General Pictures (US); MGM (France)
- Release date: July 16, 1971
- Running time: 120 minutes
- Languages: English; Spanish
- Budget: $11,000,000

The Light at the Edge of the World is a 1971 Spanish-American adventure film, directed by Kevin Billington and starring Kirk Douglas, Yul Brynner, Samantha Eggar, and Fernando Rey. It was adapted from Jules Verne's classic 1905 adventure novel The Lighthouse at the End of the World (Le Phare du bout du monde). The plot involves piracy in the South Atlantic during the mid-19th century, with a theme of survival in extreme circumstances, and events centering on an isolated lighthouse.

Despite having a large Hollywood budget, collaboration with prestigious foreign film studios, exotic shooting locations in Europe and some of the biggest name movie stars, the movie was mainly a failure at the box office.

== Plot ==
The year is 1865. Will Denton is a jaded American miner escaping a troubled past. Seeking isolation for two reasons; to mend his broken heart after a failed romance during the California Gold Rush, and also to forget his actions after he kills his former lover's new husband in self-defense in a gunfight – Denton tends a lonely and isolated lighthouse with a minimal crew including two other men.

The lighthouse sits on a fictional rocky island near the Tierra del Fuego archipelago at the southern tip of South America. Before the building of the Panama Canal, the waters off Cape Horn were perhaps the busiest and richest shipping lanes in the world, connecting Europe and the western coast of The United States.

Denton is contented to retreat from the world and be away from the problems of civilization, and quickly adjusts to his new supervisor, old Argentine sea dog Captain Moriz and his youthful and innocent assistant Felipe.

A shipload of sadistic pirates show up, murder Moriz and Felipe, and extinguish the light. They are wreckers, brigands who mislead ships into the rocks to loot the cargo and prey upon the victims. Their leader Captain Jonathan Kongre is a diabolical fiend with a charismatic facade.

Denton hides out in the caves and amongst the rocks, hiding from the pirates. He saves Italian wreck survivor Montefiore from the pirates' massacre, and together they wage a war of guerrilla tactics against Kongre and his cutthroats.

Kongre breaks his own rule by keeping one captive alive, a beautiful Englishwoman named Arabella.

Montefiore is captured while creating a diversion for an attempt by Denton to rescue Arabella, who however opts for remaining with Kongre. On the next day, Kongre has Montefiori flayed alive on his ship, trying to draw Denton out of hiding, but Denton shoots Montefiori from afar in a mercy killing to end his suffering. Angered, Kongre gives Arabella to his men and withdraws to the lighthouse. Denton uses the pirates' cannon to sink their ship, along with all the pirates except for Kongre and crewman Virgilio.

The finale of the film is a showdown between the only three survivors left on the island, Denton, Virgilio and Kongre. Kongre has Denton doused in lamp oil; a violent struggle ensues as Kongre sets the lighthouse on fire; Kongre himself is set on fire and falls from the lighthouse, while Denton escapes to safety unharmed.

== Cast ==
- Kirk Douglas as Will Denton
- Yul Brynner as Jonathan Kongre
- Samantha Eggar as Arabella
- Jean-Claude Drouot as Virgilio
- Fernando Rey as Captain Moriz
- Renato Salvatori as Montefiore
- Massimo Ranieri as Felipe
- Aldo Sambrell as Tarcante
- Tito García as Emilio
- Víctor Israel as Das Mortes

== Production ==
In 1962 it was announced Hardy Kruger and Jean Marais would star in an adaptation of the novel for Columbia Pictures.

The project was re-activated in the late 1960s by Bryna, Kirk Douglas' production company. Douglas hired Kevin Billington to direct in March 1970. Billington asked for release from his job directing A Walk in the Spring Rain. Douglas made the film as a co production with Alexander Salkyind's Vulkano Productions. National General Pictures agreed to distribute.

Finance was mostly raised from a bank in Spain. It involved people from France, Spain and Italy. Billington said "there are about 23 co-production deals; there are problems about casting and about language." Douglas said he was paid "a lot of money" for the movie, estimated at being $1 million.

Filming took place in Spain in 1970. Some of the shooting locations included:

- Jávea, Alicante, Valencia, Spain
- La Manga del Mar Menor, Murcia, Spain
- Cadaqués, Girona, Catalonia, Spain
- Cap de Creus, Girona, Catalonia, Spain
- La Pedriza, Manzanares el Real, Madrid, Spain

Filmink said Eggar "plays a character who, in the spirit of The Collector, gets kidnapped, pack raped and murdered (Quentin Tarantino loves this film)."

In November National General announced it would distribute the film.

== Reception ==
The Philadelphia Inquirer declared "the adventure film is corrupted beyond redemption by a bloodthirsty movie like The Light at the End of the World... utterly lacking the kind of excitement a kid would hope for.. instead the audience is treated to a variety of tortures." "Too violent for women and children" said the Daily News. The San Francisco Examiner called it "a cruel, stupid and brutally violent film" that "mindlessly exploits viciousness and depravity." The Los Angeles Times felt it was "too long by at least 20 minute, the picture becomes silly and boring."

The film was distributed by MGM in the UK. Billington wrote to newspapers complaining that 15 minutes were cut out and the film edited without his knowledge or approval.
