= Roald Dahl's Guide to Railway Safety =

1991 book by Roald Dahl

- Author: Roald Dahl
- Illustrator: Quentin Blake
- Cover artist: Quentin Blake
- Language: English
- Genre: Children's
- Published: 1991 British Railways Board
- Publication place: United Kingdom
- Media type: Print (paperback)
- Pages: 25

Roald Dahl's Guide to Railway Safety was published in 1991 by the British Railways Board. In a response to rising levels of train-related fatalities involving children, the British Railways Board asked Roald Dahl to write the text of the booklet, and Quentin Blake to illustrate it, to help young people enjoy using the railways safely. It was published a year after Dahl's death.

The booklet is structured as a conversation with children. In the introduction, Dahl laments that adults are always telling children what to do and what not to do, and says he would not have agreed to write the booklet, which tells children what to do, if not for the importance of what he is about to discuss. He then goes on to list the "dreaded DOs and DON'Ts" of railway safety – such as not to ride a bicycle or skateboard on a station platform, stand on platform edges, walk along rail tracks, or open train doors while the train is moving.

Many of the rules of safety given in the booklet are accompanied by humorous or sobering Blake illustrations. Some of the DOs and DON'Ts also include anecdotes from Dahl—sometimes personal, sometimes statistical—reinforcing why they are important rules to follow.

== Opening line ==
According to children's literature scholar Deborah Cogan Thacker, Dahl's "tendency", in his children's books, is to "put child characters in powerful positions" and so, the idea of "talking down" to children was always anathema, thus Dahl begins this rail safety book by stating:

"I must now regretfully become one of those unpopular giants who tells you WHAT TO DO and WHAT NOT TO DO. This is something I have never done in any of my books."

== Distribution ==
The booklet was distributed in UK primary schools to pupils in 1991, often alongside video presentations of railway safety films, such as Robbie.
