= Anatomy of Restlessness =

Collection of works by Bruce Chatwin

- First edition
- Author: Bruce Chatwin
- Language: English
- Genre: Various
- Publisher: Jonathan Cape
- Publication date: 1997
- Publication place: United Kingdom
- Media type: Print (hardback & paperback)
- Pages: 244
- ISBN: 0-224-04292-0
- OCLC: 35208446

Anatomy of Restlessness was published in 1997 and is a collection of unpublished essays, articles, short stories, and travel tales. This collection spans the twenty years of Bruce Chatwin's career as a writer. This book was brought together by Jan Borm and Matthew Graves following the death of Chatwin in 1989.
