= The Lighthouse at the End of the World =

1905 book by Jules Verne

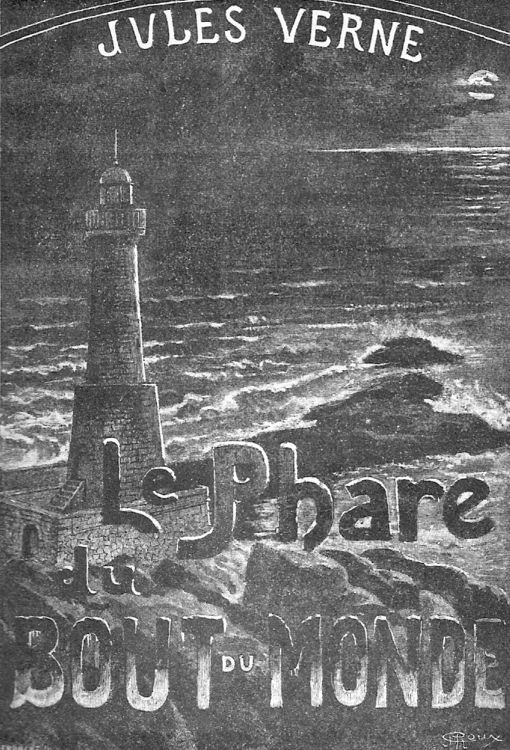
- Author: Jules Verne; Michel Verne
- Original title: Le Phare du bout du monde
- Translator: Cranstoun Metcalfe
- Illustrator: Georges Roux
- Language: French
- Genre: Adventure novel
- Publisher: Jules Hetzel
- Publication date: 1905
- Publication place: France
- English publication date: 1923
- Media type: Print (hardback & paperback)
- ISBN: 978-1-58963-094-9

The Lighthouse at the End of the World (French: Le Phare du bout du monde) is an adventure novel by French author Jules Verne. Verne wrote the first draft in 1901. The edited version was first published posthumously in 1905. The unaltered original manuscript was published in 1999. The plot of the novel involves piracy in the South Atlantic during the mid-19th century, with a theme of survival in extreme circumstances, and events centering on an isolated lighthouse. Verne was inspired by the real lighthouse at the Isla de los Estados, Argentina, near Tierra del Fuego and Cape Horn.

The novel was adapted into the 1971 movie, The Light at the Edge of the World.

== Plot summary ==
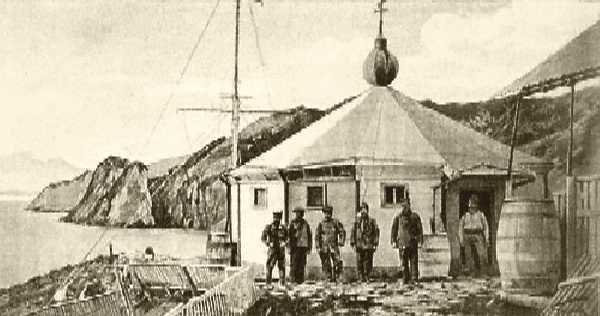
1898 photo of the actual Lighthouse San Juan del Salvamento

Verne sets the plot by stating, "The Argentine Republic had displayed a happy initiative in constructing this lighthouse at the end of the world," within Elgor Bay and the harbor of Saint-Jean "forms a kind of pendant to Elgor Bay." The despatch boat Santa-Fé arrived on Oct. 1858 to construct the lighthouse, which was inaugurated on 9 Dec. 1859, standing 103 feet in height on top of a mound 120 feet high, and illuminated by oil. The lighthouse guided ships into the Le Maire Strait or south of the island, and was to be staffed by 3 keepers over the next 3 months, until the return of the Santa-Fé.

Unbeknownst to Vasquez, Moriz, and Felipe, the chief lighthouse keeper and his helpers, the island was the domain of a dozen marooned pirates, who bide their time in wrecking.

Two of them are murdered by a band of newly arrived pirates led by one Kongre. Vasquez, the only survivor, spends several months until the dispatch boat Santa-Fé is due to return, surviving off the pirates' hidden stores of food in a cave. After the Century, an American ship from Mobile, Alabama, crashes on the island due to the light's having been put out by the pirates, Vasquez bands with the sole survivor of the wreck – First Officer John Davis – to stop the pirates from escaping into the South Pacific.

They manage to scavenge a cannon from the wreckage and shoot the pirates' ship, the Maule, as it is about to leave the bay they are situated in. The shell only causes minor damage, however, and the pirates' carpenter is able to fix it in only a few days. The night before the ship is about to attempt to leave again, Vasquez swims to the Maule at its mooring and plants a bomb in the rudder. This causes, yet again, only minor damage, and is fixed in only one day. The next day however, Carcante, the second-in-command of the pirate ship, spots the Santa-Fé on the horizon. Fortunately for the pirates, it will not arrive until nighttime, and the Santa Fe can't possibly get into the bay without light from the lighthouse. This will give the pirates the perfect chance to slip out and sail around the southern side of the island, which they know quite well by now.

Vasquez and Davis, however, return to the lighthouse and turn the light back on. The troop of pirates tries to regain the lighthouse and kill the two, but they find the bolted iron door to the staircase too reinforced to break down. Kongre, the band's leader, orders Carcante and the carpenter to climb the side of the lighthouse and murder Vasquez and Davis at the top, but they are shot as soon as their heads peek over the banister. Kongre and the remaining pirates realize it is all over for them and flee to the island's interior. Most surrender afterward, a few starve, and Vasquez watches as Kongre commits suicide. Vasquez returns home with the Santa-Fé after making sure the island is safe for the new lighthousemen.

== See also ==
- Jamaica Inn
