= The Princess of the Tide =

Poem by Mikhail Lermontov

"The Princess of the Tide" (Russian: Морская царевна) is one of the last ballads by Mikhail Lermontov, written shortly before his death in 1841. Lermontov explores his classic theme: the horrors of losing freedom and the cost of that loss.
