= Pirate Latitudes =

2009 novel by Michael Crichton

- First edition cover
- Author: Michael Crichton
- Language: English
- Genre: Historical fiction, Adventure
- Publisher: HarperCollins
- Publication date: November 26, 2009
- Publication place: United States of America
- Pages: 313
- ISBN: 978-0-06-192937-3
- OCLC: 318430694
- Preceded by: Next
- Followed by: Micro

Pirate Latitudes is an action-adventure novel by Michael Crichton, the sixteenth novel to be published under his own name and first to be published after his death, concerning 17th-century piracy in the Caribbean. HarperCollins published the book posthumously on November 26, 2009. The story stars the fictional privateer Captain Charles Hunter who, hired by Jamaica's governor Sir James Almont, plots to raid a Spanish galleon for its treasure.

== Background ==
Crichton's assistant discovered the manuscript on one of Crichton's computers after his death in 2008, along with an unfinished novel, Micro (2011).

According to Marla Warren, there is evidence that Crichton had been working on Pirate Latitudes at least since the 1970s; to substantiate her position, she quotes a statement by Patrick McGilligan in the March 1979 issue of American Film that Crichton was aiming "to complete a long-standing book project about Caribbean pirates in the seventeenth century". In 1981, Crichton said he was working on a pirate story, and he mentioned a research-trip to Jamaica in 1982 in his non-fiction book Travels (1988).

According to Jonathan Burnham, a publisher of a HarperCollins imprint, Pirate Latitudes had been written concurrently with Crichton's then most recent novel, Next (2006).

== Historical basis ==
Alan Cheuse said, in review for NPR Books: "It builds on an actual event in maritime records" when pirates out of the Caribbean port of Port Royal attacked a fortress on a Spanish island in order to plunder – I like that word, and it's what pirates do, they plunder – a ship filled with new world treasure."

Though reviewers have compared Crichton's novel to Disney's Pirates of the Caribbean, the Historical Novel Society notes: "Crichton's portrayal of Port Royal and its inhabitants is far more grounded in reality than Disney's portrayal."

== Plot ==
In September 1665, Captain Charles Hunter is hired as a privateer by the Governor of Jamaica, Sir James Almont, to lead an expedition to the island fortress of Matanceros. Almont is excited about the possibility of reward in this venture, though his secretary, Mr. Robert Hacklett, is less than enthusiastic and calls Hunter a pirate.

They travel out to Matanceros. Mere days into the journey, they come across trouble and get locked up. Hunter and his crew reboard their ship after breaking free and continue on their way before they get caught again.

Upon their arrival at Matanceros, Hunter, Black Eye, Lazue, Sanson, and the Moor all make their way behind the fortress. Encountering high cliffs, rough jungle foliage, and deadly animals, the crew comes to see that Cazalla has docked under the suspicion that Hunter is still on his way to the island. The privateers manage to make their way around the village and the soldiers occupying it long enough to set their traps. After a short duel between Hunter and Cazalla, the traps are sprung, and a cut to the throat kills Cazalla. The Cassandra appears, and the crew takes their captain, his shipmates, and the galleon out to sea.

After a few days, the treasure inside the galleon, El Trinidad, is accounted for, but Hunter refuses to split the treasure between the two ships, not trusting Sanson. Soon afterward, Hunter discovers he is being pursued by the warship commanded by Bosquet, Cazalla's second-in-command. Hunter is chased to Monkey Bay, where he narrowly evades capture with the aid of Lazue's keen eyesight. The sun's glare on the ocean renders the warship unable to follow. Here, Hunter waits a few days, until the crew spy an impending hurricane. Now they divide the treasure between the two ships, in case one sinks in the storm and all is lost. Using Don Diego's genius, they arm their cannons and aim for a mere two defensive shots. Upon their departure, however, the warship has disappeared.

While celebrating their surprise escape, they see – a few miles out to sea – the warship quickly approaching their stern. With Hunter aboard, El Trinidad sustains massive damage from cannon fire. The aimed cannons fire upon the warship, merely damaging it with the first shot and seeming to miss entirely with the second. However, after a moment of inactivity, Hunter realizes the second shot actually landed a devastating blow, and the attacking ship explodes and sinks rapidly. Moments later, there is little evidence of the warship.

Victory evades the two ships, however, as rain and storm begin. The El Trinidad and the Cassandra, helmed by Sanson, are separated by fierce winds and strong currents. After the storm abates, Hunter finds El Trinidad beached on a strange island. A few hours later, they see the island is inhabited by cannibal natives, who nearly capture Governor Almont's niece. On their way back to Port Royal, the crew suffers yet another misfortune when a Kraken (see "lusca") attacks their ship. After the beast has killed many and damaged the vessel, Hunter manages to mortally injure it. Their path to Port Royal is finally clear.

Upon the crew's arrival, a courier informs them that Almont is gravely sick, and Hacklett has taken charge as governor. Hunter is arrested and put to trial, at which Sanson betrays his captain and lies to the court. Hunter is sentenced to be placed in prison and then hanged. With the aid of Almont (who was being held prisoner by Hacklett), Hunter is sprung from prison and kills the men who sentenced him, save for the judge, who pardons Hunter. Hacklett is shot in the groin by his wife (whom he has caused to be raped by an associate), and Sanson sends word that he alone knows where the other half of the treasure is. Hunter turns the man's own crossbow against him, killing Sanson, and throws his body overboard letting the sharks eat his body, and is never able to find Sanson's treasure.

== Film adaptation ==
In August 2009, Steven Spielberg (an admirer of Crichton's work) announced his intention to adapt the novel to film, reportedly having wanted to make a pirate film. Spielberg hired David Koepp to pen the screenplay. Anil Ambani's Reliance Big Entertainment and Spielberg's DreamWorks Studios were to produce the film, which would have been the third of Crichton's novels Spielberg adapted, after the highly successful Jurassic Park films. As of 2024, no new news about a potential film has been released. By agreement, any film based on Crichton works must be approved by his widow Sherri. Sherri Crichton has authorised Spielberg for an adaptation of a Crichton novel finished by James Patterson, Eruption.

== Bibliography ==
- Maslin, Janet (November 22, 2009). "Vile Heroes and High-Seas Swagger". The New York Times.
