= The Survivors of the "Jonathan" =

1909 novel by Jules Verne and Michel Verne

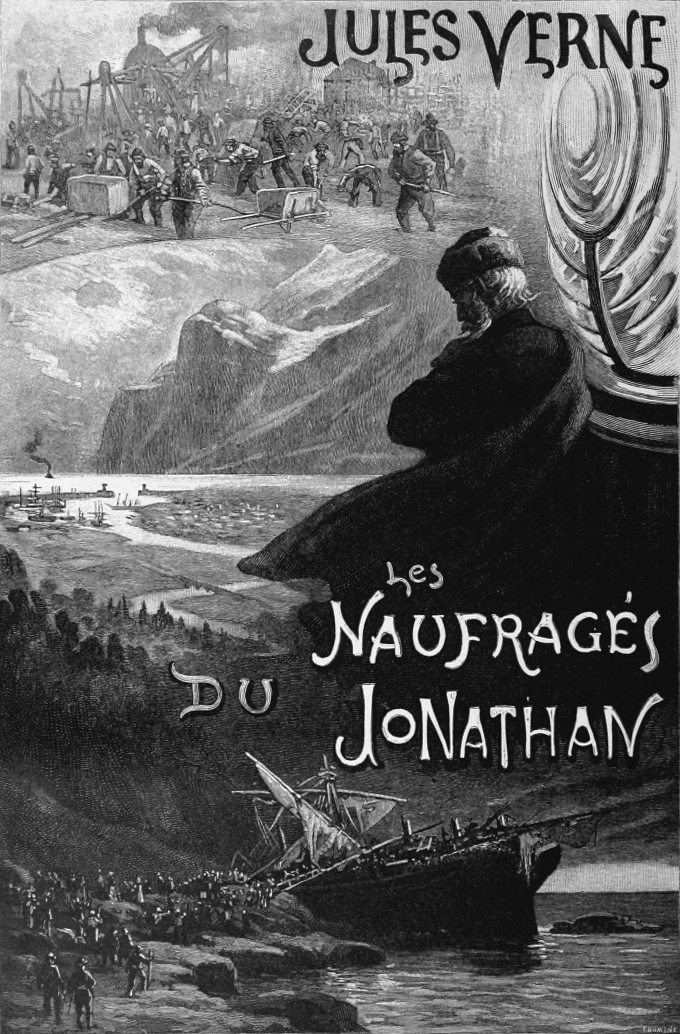
- A 1909 French edition published by Pierre-Jules Hetzel
- Author: Jules Verne; Michel Verne
- Original title: Les naufragés du "Jonathan"
- Illustrator: Georges Roux
- Language: French
- Genre: Political
- Published: 1909
- Publication place: France
- English publication date: 2002

2008 paperback edition by Welcome Rain, with translation by Benjamin Ivry.

The Survivors of the "Jonathan" is a novel that was written by Jules Verne in 1897 under the title En Magellanie (Au Bout du monde) (Spanish: En la Magallanía). However, it was not published until 1909, after it had been rewritten by Verne's son Michel under the title Les naufragés du "Jonathan".

== Plot ==
The novel tells the story of a mysterious man named Kaw-djer. Kaw-djer lives in the land of Magellania, that is, the region around the Straits of Magellan. Kaw-djer, whose motto is "Neither God nor master", helps himself survive and also provides assistance to the indigenous peoples of Magellania. However, when a group of settlers is shipwrecked on a nearby island (Hoste Island), Kaw-djer assists them establish their colony, though he refuses to rule over them or control them in any way. However, when the colony falls victim to a fight for power, Kaw-djer is forced to temporarily abandon his own anarchistic principles. After he restores order, he abdicates and becomes a lighthouse-keeper, thereby retaining his individualism.

== History ==
Piero Gondolo della Riva discovered the original manuscript in the Hetzel family archives in 1977.

The two parts of the novel were subsequently translated and published separately in English as Masterless Man and Unwilling Dictator.
