= Carey Wilson (writer) =

American writer (1889–1962)

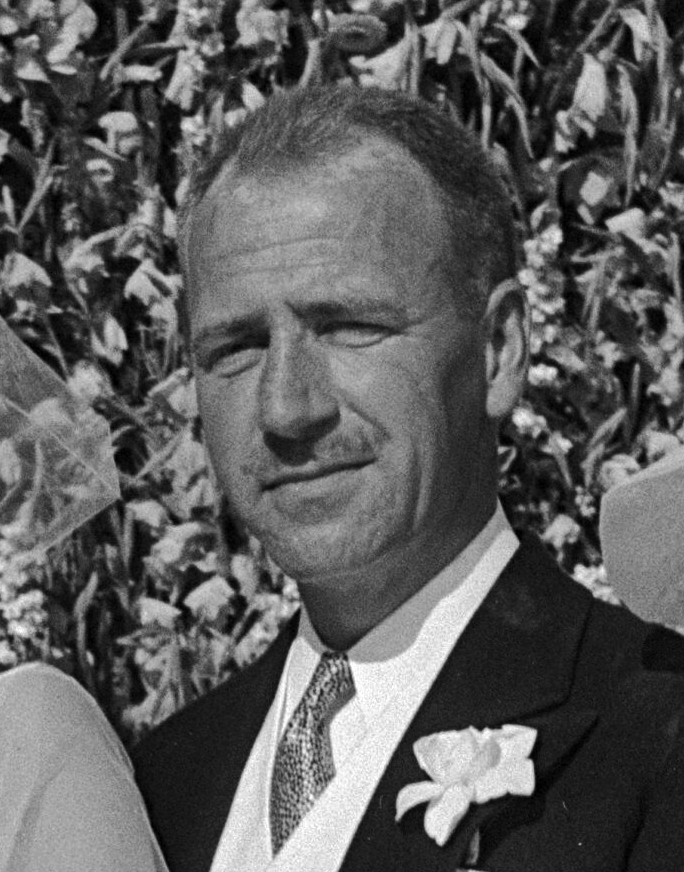
- Wilson in 1934
- Born: May 19, 1889; Philadelphia, Pennsylvania, U.S.
- Died: February 1, 1962 (aged 72); Hollywood, Los Angeles, U.S.
- Occupations: writer, producer, and voice actor
- Years active: 1923-1953
- Spouse: Carmelita Geraghty (m. 1934–1962)

Carey Wilson (May 19, 1889 – February 1, 1962) was an American screenwriter, voice actor, and producer.

== Life and career ==
Born in 1889 in Philadelphia, Wilson's screenplays include Ben-Hur (1925), Mutiny on the Bounty (1935), and The Great Heart (1938). His credits as producer include Green Dolphin Street (1947). He also narrated many nuclear test films, produced by the Atomic Energy Commission – now the United States Department of Energy – and by the United States Department of Defense, including ones on Operation Sandstone (1948) and Operation Greenhouse (1951).

Wilson was one of the thirty-six Hollywood pioneers who founded the Academy of Motion Picture Arts and Sciences in 1927. He also collaborated with Jean Harlow on her novel Today is Tonight.

In the 1934 California gubernatorial election Democrat Upton Sinclair ran against Republican Frank Merriam, the latter of whom MGM supported. Irving Thalberg was to lead MGM's anti-Sinclair campaign and the studio recruited Wilson to create a series of anti-Sinclair propaganda films. These films, directed by Felix E. Feist, included fake newsreels of Sinclair supporters who were portrayed as bums and criminals. They were shown in Californian movie theaters, with one episode featuring hired actors as Sinclair supporters speaking with foreign accents.

== Legacy ==
For his contribution in films, Wilson has a star on the Hollywood Walk of Fame, located on 6301 Hollywood Blvd.

In a 2011 episode of the reality TV series Pawn Stars, Wilson's granddaughter was featured, as she sold a cigarette lighter and ID badge that had belonged to him during his time as a propaganda filmmaker for the United States government.

== Selected filmography ==
Writer/producer

- Madonnas and Men (1920)
- A Woman's Business (1920)
- The Cup of Life (1921)
- Red Lights (1923)
- Three Weeks (1924)
- Wine of Youth (1924)
- Empty Hands (1924)
- The Midshipman (1925)
- The Masked Bride (1925)
- Soul Mates (1925)
- Ben-Hur (1925)
- The Silent Lover (1926)
- The Tender Hour (1927)
- The Stolen Bride (1927)
- The Awakening (1928)
- Geraldine (1929)
- The Bad One (1930)
- Fanny Foley Herself (1931)
- Behind Office Doors (1931)
- Gabriel Over the White House (1933)
- Bolero (1934)
- Mutiny on the Bounty (1935)
- The Boss Didn't Say Good Morning (1937)
- What Do You Think?: Tupapaoo (1938)
- The Great Heart (1938)
- Nostradamus (1938)
- Prophet Without Honor (1939)
- Miracle at Lourdes (1939)
- A Door Will Open (1940)
- A Failure at Fifty (1940)
- More About Nostradamus (1941)
- Further Prophecies of Nostradamus (1942)
- You, John Jones! (1943)
- Nostradamus IV (1944)
- Strange Destiny (1945)

Producer

- The Stolen Bride (1927)
- The Postman Always Rings Twice (1946)
- Green Dolphin Street (1947), producer
- Dark Delusion (1947), co-producer
- The Red Danube (1950), producer
- Scaramouche (1952), producer
