= The Fetishist (Min novel) =

2024 novel by Katherine Min

- Author: Katherine Min
- Language: English
- Publication date: 2024

The Fetishist (2024) is a novel by American writer Katherine Min.The introduction was written by Cathy Park Hong, a poet.

It is Min's second, and final, novel. It was published posthumously. The author died in 2019.

== Background ==
Min was Korean American. She was born in Illinois to parents who were immigrants from South Korea.

The author used Lolita as inspiration for this novel.

Min was working on her novel until 2014, when a diagnosis of breast cancer caused her to decide to stop creating fiction. She continued to teach writing, and devoted herself to writing essays exploring her treatment and living her final days. In 2019, she died.

She had not left directions for her unfinished manuscript.

Kayla Min Andrews, the author's daughter, obtained a computer that had a copy of the manuscript. She used this to have the book published. It had author's notes, as Min had been working on it before she was diagnosed with cancer.

== Reception ==
Lauren LeBlanc of the Los Angeles Times wrote "For an ostensibly unfinished manuscript, it was remarkably polished."

== Legacy ==
In 2019, the year that Min died, her family established a fellowship in her honor at MacDowell residency, aimed at supporting Asian-American authors. Min had been a fellow there eight times during her writing career.

== Plot ==
The main characters are Alma Soon Ja Lee, a Korean American cellist, a child prodigy; Daniel Karmody, an Irish American violinist; and Kyoko Tokugawa, a younger Japanese American woman involved in punk rock and manga.

Alma, from California, has developed multiple sclerosis as an adult. She expects it to be fatal. Alma previously played the cello. She and Daniel were in a relationship in their early adulthood, but it failed after he had an affair with another ethnic Asian, Japanese-American Emi Tokugawa.

Over the years Daniel has continued to have affairs with other Asian American women, and is described as having a sexual fetish for them. Asians referred to such white men as "rice kings". Emi Tokugawa committed suicide after Daniel rejected her in his trail of affairs. She left her daughter, Kyoko.

Daniel, a resident of Baltimore, Maryland, used to play in a string quartet. Now he mostly leads a musical group called "Thanatos," which plays music for rich people facing death.

As the novel opens, Kyoko is 23-years-old, also a resident of Baltimore. She draws comics in a manga style, and also sings for a band with a punk rock theme.

Kyoko has a grudge against Daniel and wishes to kill him. Kyoko kidnaps Daniel, and confines him in the basement of her home. Ultimately Daniel realizes that he had acted badly in the past and decides to atone for his actions.

== Reception ==
People ranked the novel as one of the "Best Books To Read in January 2024", 14/21. It cited Marion Winik of the Seattle Times, who described the novel as "a delightful, fantastic novel". It was listed as one listed as one of the Best Books of the Year in Harpers Bazaar and the Boston Globe.

Sophia Nguyen of the Washington Post described the work as "ahead of its time". Lauren LeBlanc of the Los Angeles Times also described the book as such.

Publishers Weekly stated that "the technicolor, Tarantino-esque crime plot can be great fun." The PW review stated that The Fetishist "initially sets out to restore a sense of humanity to" Daniel's victims, and that how Daniel atones and how the novel focuses on that "is a curious and somewhat frustrating" development.

Kelly Martin of National Public Radio said that there was "boisterous, prickly prose"; ultimately her review was mostly positive. She argued that Kyoko's segments were the least strong in the story. Kirkus Reviews cites an issue with the ending of the novel, noting it is framed as a fairy tale, "perhaps to relieve the concern that these stories, gaping with grief, have sealed a bit too neatly by the end."

== See also ==
- Secondhand World - 2006 novel by Min
