= Gather Yourselves Together =

Novel by Philip K. Dick

- Cover of first edition (hardcover)
- Author: Philip K. Dick
- Language: English
- Genre: Novel
- Publisher: WCS Books
- Publication date: 1994
- Publication place: United States
- Media type: Print (hardcover)
- Pages: 292 pp
- ISBN: 1-878914-05-7
- OCLC: 32049351
- Dewey Decimal: 813/.54 20
- LC Class: PS3554.I3 G33 1994
- Followed by: Voices from the Street

Gather Yourselves Together is an early novel by the science fiction author Philip K. Dick, written around 1948–1950, and published posthumously by WCS Books in 1994. As with many of his early books which were considered unsuitable for publication when they were first submitted as manuscripts, this was not science fiction, but rather a work of straight literary fiction. The manuscript was 481 pages in length. At the time it was published, it was one of only two Dick novels for which the manuscript was known to exist which remained unpublished. The other, Voices from the Street, was published in 2007.

Dwight Brown wrote the afterword. As of 2011, the original hardcover edition was out of print; in July 2012, Houghton Mifflin Harcourt released a trade paperback edition of Gather Yourselves Together, complete with Brown's afterword.

== Plot summary ==
American Metals Development Company ("the Company") maintains an industrial site in China near the Indian border. After Mao Zedong's Communists proclaim the People's Republic of China in 1949, the Company's Chinese assets are seized. The Company negotiates safe passage for its workers out of the country provided three people remain to hand the factory over to the Communists when they arrive. Three workers are chosen at random: the bitter 24-year-old Barbara Mahler; the cynical, older ex-radio host Verne Tildon; and the curious, naive 23-year-old Carl Fitter.

Four years earlier, at a resort town near Boston named Castle, Barbara lost her virginity to Verne. In the present, Barbara holds a grudge against Verne, believing he took advantage of her at a young age. They have sex again out of boredom, after which Barbara is frightened by a ghost which she takes a sign to move on from Verne. Barbara begins seducing Carl, who is more interested in exploring the factory and reading his handwritten volume of personal philosophy to her.

A representative from the Chinese People's Political Consultative Conference, Harry Liu, arrives at the site ahead of time. While talking to him, Verne makes an analogy that the trio are the last of the old world, like Romans near the end of the empire, and the Chinese are like the first Christians at the beginning of the new world. They debate if the Communist regime's promises are empty or not, with Harry believing that some degree of myth and untruth is necessary for social organising. Verne gives Harry his pipe lighter as a present "from the old world to the new", which Harry destroys as he leaves.

Carl experiences his sexual awakening watching Barbara bathe naked in a lake. Later that night, he finishes reading his manuscript to her. Barbara forces herself onto Carl, taking his virginity.

The rest of the CPPCC arrive the following morning. Carl asks a soldier how he knows his use of force is justified: the soldier takes out and reads a Communist tract about rising up against the bourgeoisie. Carl thanks the soldier, then gets in a truck with Barbara and Verne to leave.
