= Matecumbe (novel) =

2007 novel by James Michener

Matecumbe: A Lost Florida Novel
- Author: James Michener
- Language: English
- Genre: Historical novel
- Publisher: University of Florida Press
- Publication date: 2007
- Publication place: United States
- Media type: Print (Softcover)
- Pages: 165pp.
- ISBN: 0-8130-3152-4

Matecumbe (2007) is a novel by American author James A. Michener, published unfinished, posthumously.

Set in Florida, Matecumbe is a small, character-driven story detailing the relationship of a mother and daughter, both divorced and living parallel lives. The book was abandoned by Michener when Random House urged for more of his larger, epic-scope novels. It was published during the 10th anniversary year after his death (and the 100th anniversary year of his birth) in its unpolished state.

== Reception ==
Christopher Reynolds of the Los Angeles Times wrote that the novel is "not much good" and that the "details don't particularly resonate, the insights don't arrive." William McKeen of the Tampa Bay Times called it a "lightweight compared with earlier works" and wrote: "The dialogue is cloying and not believable; the story has no depth. The afterword claims Michener intended it as allegory. If so, he fired and missed." Publishers Weekly wrote that the novel reads "like a formula romance with none of the formula’s pap pleasures."
