= Nomad: In the Footsteps of Bruce Chatwin =

2019 documentary film by Werner Herzog

- Directed by: Werner Herzog
- Written by: Werner Herzog
- Produced by: Lucki Stipetić; Steve O'Hagan
- Narrated by: Werner Herzog
- Cinematography: Louis Caulfield; Mike Paterson
- Edited by: Marco Capalbo
- Music by: Ernst Reijseger
- Production companies: BBC Studios; Sideways Film; ZDF; Arte
- Distributed by: Music Box Films
- Release date: 28 April 2019 (Tribeca)
- Running time: 89 minutes
- Language: English

Nomad: In the Footsteps of Bruce Chatwin is a 2019 British documentary film by German director Werner Herzog. It chronicles the life of British travel writer Bruce Chatwin and includes interviews with Chatwin's widow, Elizabeth Chatwin, and biographer Nicholas Shakespeare, as well as detailing Herzog's own friendship and collaboration with the man.

== Synopsis ==
The film is divided into eight chapters, in which Herzog travels to Patagonia, the Black Mountains in Wales, and the Outback of Australia, where he meets Chatwin's friends and others who shed light on his life and art.

1. The Skin of the Brontosaurus - Herzog visits Punta Arenas, the Cueva del Milodón Natural Monument, and Last Hope Sound in Patagonia. He meets Karin Eberhard, the great-granddaughter of 19th-century explorer Hermann Eberhard, who discovered the Giant Sloth that plays a significant role in Chatwin's first book In Patagonia, and the Kenyan paleoanthropologist Richard Leakey.

2. Landscapes of the Soul - Visits Avebury and Silbury Hill in Wiltshire near to Chatwin's school of Marlborough College. Talks to Chatwin's widow Elizabeth at Llanthony Priory. Mentions his 1968 film Signs of Life. Meets Australian anthropologist Petronella Vaarzon-Morel and visits Coober Pedy in South Australia. Mentions that both men shared a fascination with the Aboriginal people of Australia, and first met while Herzog was filming Where the Green Ants Dream and Chatwin was researching The Songlines.

3. Songs and Songlines - Travels to Central Australia where he meets a number of Australians, including Aboriginal elders. He discusses the anthropologist Ted Strehlow and his book The Songs of Central Australia with Shaun Angeles Penange of the Strehlow Research Centre, before visiting Hermannsburg in the Northern Territory.

4. The Nomadic Alternative - Discusses Chatwin's unfinished book The Nomadic Alternative with his biographer Nicholas Shakespeare. Discusses the hunter-gatherers of Patagonia, showing vintage photographs of the Selkʼnam people and the rock art at the Cueva de las Manos in Rio Pinturas. He discusses his own documentary Herdsmen of the Sun.

5. Journey to the End of the World - Herzog crosses the Beagle Channel and finds an archaeological dig on Navarino Island, then visits Puerto Williams. He talks with Elizabeth Chatwin and Nicholas Shakespeare about Bruce Chatwin as a storyteller and mimic. Reads from Chatwin's essay Werner Herzog in Ghana.

6. Chatwin's Rucksack - Herzog talks about Chatwin's rucksack and how it came to play a role in his life in his film Scream of Stone, which he calls a 'homage to Bruce Chatwin'. He mentions how the author liked Herzog's film Fitzcarraldo and his book Of Walking in Ice.

7. Cobra Verde - He talks about Chatwin's visit to the set of Cobra Verde (which was based on his book The Viceroy of Ouidah).

8. The Book Is Closed - Herzog talks about Chatwin's sexuality, marriage, conversion, and mortality.

== Release ==
The film had its world premiere at the Tribeca Film Festival on 28 April 2019. It screened at the Sheffield Doc/Fest on 8 June 2019, the Telluride Film Festival on 30 August. The film is globally distributed by Sideways Film. The film was shown on BBC Two in the UK on 21 September 2019.

== Production ==
Nomad: In the Footsteps of Bruce Chatwin, was commissioned by BBC Arts’ Mark Bell to mark 30 years since the death of the renowned travel writer and novelist. The production filmed in the Australian Outback, Patagonia and the Black Mountains in Wales. Herzog said that he wanted to create a “erratic quest” rather than a "biographical film” which are "not a good soil from which movies grow." The film aimed to mirror Chatwin’s fascination with “wild characters, strange dreamers, big ideas about the nature of human existence”. The music was composed and performed by Dutch cellist Ernst Reijseger (the fifth film he has scored for Herzog).

== Critical reception ==
Upon its North American theatrical release, Nomad: In the Footsteps of Bruce Chatwin was acclaimed by critics. On Rotten Tomatoes, the film has a 90% approval rating based on 39 reviews, with an average rating of 7.5/10. The site's critical consensus reads, "Another rewardingly idiosyncratic documentary from Werner Herzog, Nomad: In the Footsteps of Bruce Chatwin finds the master filmmaker paying warm tribute to a friend." Nick Schager, writing in Variety, called the film "heartfelt" and says that Herzog vividly brings Chatwin to life while capturing his "attraction to the intersection of nature, history, dreams, and myth", as well as both men's artistic friendship and mutual willingness to embellish the truth. Schrager also mentions that the film's shots of nature convey a deep sense of beauty and mystery that is enhanced by Reijseger’s score. The film was dubbed "very worthwhile" for fans of either Herzog or Chatwin by John Defore in The Hollywood Reporter. The Evening Standard of London wondered if both Bruce Chatwin and Werner Herzog might be little known for many audiences. David Katz in Cineuropa says that the film's obscure British angle should not put off viewers who will find both that Herzog is re-energised by the subject matter that is close to his heart (after a number of less successful projects), and audiences get to learn about Herzog himself. The i newspaper called the film 'bewitching', and that it made one glad for curious souls like Herzog and Chatwin.
