= Winding Paths =

1998 book by Bruce Chatwin

- Author: Bruce Chatwin
- Language: English
- Genre: Art
- Publisher: Jonathan Cape
- Publication date: 1998
- Publication place: United Kingdom
- Media type: Print (Hardback & Paperback)
- Pages: 192
- ISBN: 0-224-06050-3
- OCLC: 43340723

Winding Paths is a book containing a collection of photographs taken by British author Bruce Chatwin during his various travels. These include photographs from the period when he was writing his other works: In Patagonia, The Viceroy of Ouidah, On the Black Hill, The Songlines and Utz. The book was originally published in Italian by Adelphi and contains an introduction by Roberto Calasso.
