= The Dancer Upstairs =

The Dancer Upstairs may refer to:

- The Dancer Upstairs (novel), a 1995 novel by Nicholas Shakespeare
- The Dancer Upstairs (film), a 2002 Spanish-American crime thriller film, based on the novel
