= What Am I Doing Here =

What Am I Doing Here may refer to:

- "What Am I Doing Here" (song), written and recorded by Canadian country rock group Blue Rodeo, released in June 1991
- What Am I Doing Here (book) (1988), a book by British Author Bruce Chatwin, containing a collection of essays, profiles and travel stories from his life
- "What Am I Doing Here", song by Dido from Still on My Mind
- "What Am I Doing Here?", song by Rollins Band from Life Time
