= In Patagonia =

1977 travel book by English writer Bruce Chatwin

- Cover of the first edition
- Author: Bruce Chatwin
- Language: English
- Genre: Travel
- Publisher: Jonathan Cape
- Publication date: 1977
- Publication place: United Kingdom
- Media type: Print (Hardback & Paperback)
- Pages: 240
- ISBN: 0-224-01419-6
- OCLC: 3687188
- Dewey Decimal: 918.27/04/6
- LC Class: F2936 .C47

In Patagonia is an English travel book by Bruce Chatwin, published in 1977. In it, Chatwin describes his travels in Patagonia, the southern part of South America.

== Preparations ==
During the Second World War, Chatwin and his mother stayed at the home of his paternal grandparents, who had a curiosity cabinet that fascinated him. Among the items it contained was a "piece of brontosaurus" (actually a mylodon, a giant sloth), which had been sent to Chatwin's grandmother by her cousin Charles Amherst Milward.

In a cave in Chilean Patagonia, Milward had discovered the remains of a giant sloth, which he later sold to the British Museum. He sent his cousin a piece of the animal's skin. The skin was later lost, but it inspired Chatwin decades later to visit Patagonia.

In 1972, Chatwin was hired by the Sunday Times Magazine as an adviser on art and architecture. In 1972, he interviewed the 93-year-old architect and designer Eileen Gray in her Paris salon, where he noticed a map of the area of South America called Patagonia, which she had painted. "I've always wanted to go there," Bruce told her. "So have I," she replied. "Go there for me."

== In Patagonia ==
Two years later, in November 1974, Chatwin flew out to Lima, Peru, and reached Patagonia a month later. He would later claim that he sent a telegram to his editor, merely stating: "Have gone to Patagonia." Actually, he sent a letter: "I am doing a story there for myself, something I have always wanted to write up." He spent six months in the area, traveling around, gathering stories of people who came from elsewhere and settled there. He used his quest for his own "piece of brontosaurus" (the one from his grandparents' cabinet had been thrown away years earlier) to frame the story of his trip.

Chatwin described In Patagonia as "the narrative of an actual journey and a symbolic one ... It is supposed to fall into the category or be a spoof of Wonder Voyage: the narrator goes to a far country in search of a strange animal: on his way he lands in strange situations, people or other books tell him strange stories which add up to form a message."

== Content ==
The book is experimental in the way that it is structured. It is divided into a total of 97 separate sections, some of which are as short as a lone paragraph. In a sense this construction with its frequent use of digression, rather than a linear structure, mirrors one of the underlying themes of the work as a whole: a meditation upon wandering and nomadism in human life. This is accentuated by the fact that many of the narratives of the people that Chatwin meets in the work involve discussions of the nomadic life.

Chatwin's route takes him from Buenos Aires south through Argentina as far as Ushuaia, and thence to Punta Arenas, Puerto Natales and the Cueva del Milodon in Chile. The many topics he discusses in the book include the landscape and wildlife of Patagonia, the history of European exploration and settlement, Butch Cassidy's time in Patagonia, anarchists and strikers, and the fate of the native inhabitants.

== Reception ==
This work established Chatwin's reputation as a travel writer. One of his biographers, Nicholas Murray, called In Patagonia "one of the most strikingly original postwar English travel books" and said that it revitalised the genre of travel writing.

The New York Times described it as a "little masterpiece of travel, history, and adventure." Some reviewers compared it with classics of travel literature such as Travels by Sir John Mandeville, Eothen by Alexander Kinglake and The Road to Oxiana by Robert Byron.

However, residents in the region contradicted the account of events depicted in Chatwin's book. It was the first time in his career, but not the last, that conversations and characters which Chatwin presented as fact were later alleged to be fiction. In the words of his biographer Nicholas Shakespeare, "Critics ... suspected that a number of Chatwin's brontosauri were mylodons."

Some editions of In Patagonia contain 15 black and white photographs by Chatwin. According to Susannah Clapp, who edited the book, "Rebecca West amused Chatwin by telling him that these were so good they rendered superfluous the entire text of the book."

== Prizes ==
For In Patagonia Chatwin received the Hawthornden Prize and the E. M. Forster Award from the American Academy of Arts and Letters.
