= Moleskine =

Italian manufacturing company

Coordinates: 45°29′43.6″N 9°10′57.3″E

- The current Moleskine logo as of August 2016.
- Type: SRL a socio unico
- Industry: Manufacturing; Product design; Papermaking
- Founded: 1997; 29 years ago
- Founder: Maria Sebregondi, Co-Founder
- Headquarters: Viale Piceno 17, Milan, 20159, Italy
- Area served: Worldwide
- Key people: Christophe Archaimbault (CEO)
- Products: Journal; Paper; Planners
- Revenue: 122,300,000 (2024)
- Number of employees: 420 (2025)
- Divisions: With its headquarters in Milan, Italy, the Moleskine Group also includes Moleskine America Inc., Moleskine Asia Ltd, and Moleskine Germany among others.
- Website: www.moleskine.com

Moleskine (Italian pronunciation: [moleˈskiːne]) is an Italian manufacturer, papermaker, and product designer. It was founded in 1997 by Maria Sebregondi and is based in Milan, Italy. It produces and designs luxury notebooks, as well as planners, sketchbooks, leather backpacks, holdalls, journals, wallets, various accessories, and stationery.

Moleskine's notebooks are stylised to follow the aesthetics of a 'traditional' black notebook with rounded corners and ivory-coloured paper. They are bound in cardboard with a sewn spine that allows the notebook to lie flat. An elastic band is used to seal, and a ribbon bookmark is included along with an expandable pocket inside the rear cover, which is packed in a paper banderole.

Bruce Chatwin's name is used to sell Moleskine notebooks. Chatwin wrote in The Songlines of little black oilskin-covered notebooks that he bought in Paris and called "moleskines". The name Moleskine does not have an official pronunciation.

== History ==
In the late 19th and early 20th centuries, compact black notebooks bound in durable oil-cloth—colloquially called carnets moleskines—were produced by small Parisian bookbinders and reportedly favoured by artists and writers such as Vincent van Gogh, Pablo Picasso and Ernest Hemingway. This term moleskine is itself derived from the English word moleskin. Travel writer Bruce Chatwin popularised the English term “moleskine”; in his 1987 book The Songlines he described buying stacks of the notebooks in Paris and lamented their disappearance after the last workshop in Tours closed in 1986.

In the mid-1990s, Maria Sebregondi pitched the idea of resurrecting the iconic notebooks to the company Modo & Modo, despite the shelves of stationery stores already being stocked with blank books at the time. As a result, Modo & Modo trademarked the Moleskine brand and began production of 5,000 notebooks, officially reintroducing them in 1997.

By 1998, Modo & Modo were producing 30,000 notebooks a year and expanded their market, distributing their products across Europe. By 2000 Modo & Modo SpA had an office with a small staff and sales of €20M ($26M) in Milan. In 2004, Moleskine notebooks were exported to Japan, and from there, distribution to Asia began.

In 2006, the company was purchased by the European private equity firm now known as Syntegra Capital. At that time, it was reported that the company’s small staff was unable to keep up with demand. In August 2006, the French investment fund Société Générale Capital purchased Modo & Modo SpA, and invested in its expansion. The company name changed to Moleskine Srl.

By July 2012, Moleskine collections were distributed in 22,000 stores across 95 countries. In March 2013 the company announced an IPO at the Borsa Italiana. Moleskine became a joint-stock company and is now Moleskine SpA; it is still headquartered in Milan.

At the end of September 2016, the Belgian investment group D'Ieteren acquired a 41% stake in Moleskine. After having launched a public takeover offer on the remaining shares of the company, D'Ieteren crossed the 95% threshold, which gives it the right to launch a squeeze out procedure in order to gain full control of Moleskine. D'Ieteren's intention is to delist Moleskine from the Milan Stock Exchange.

== Products ==
=== Notebooks and journals ===
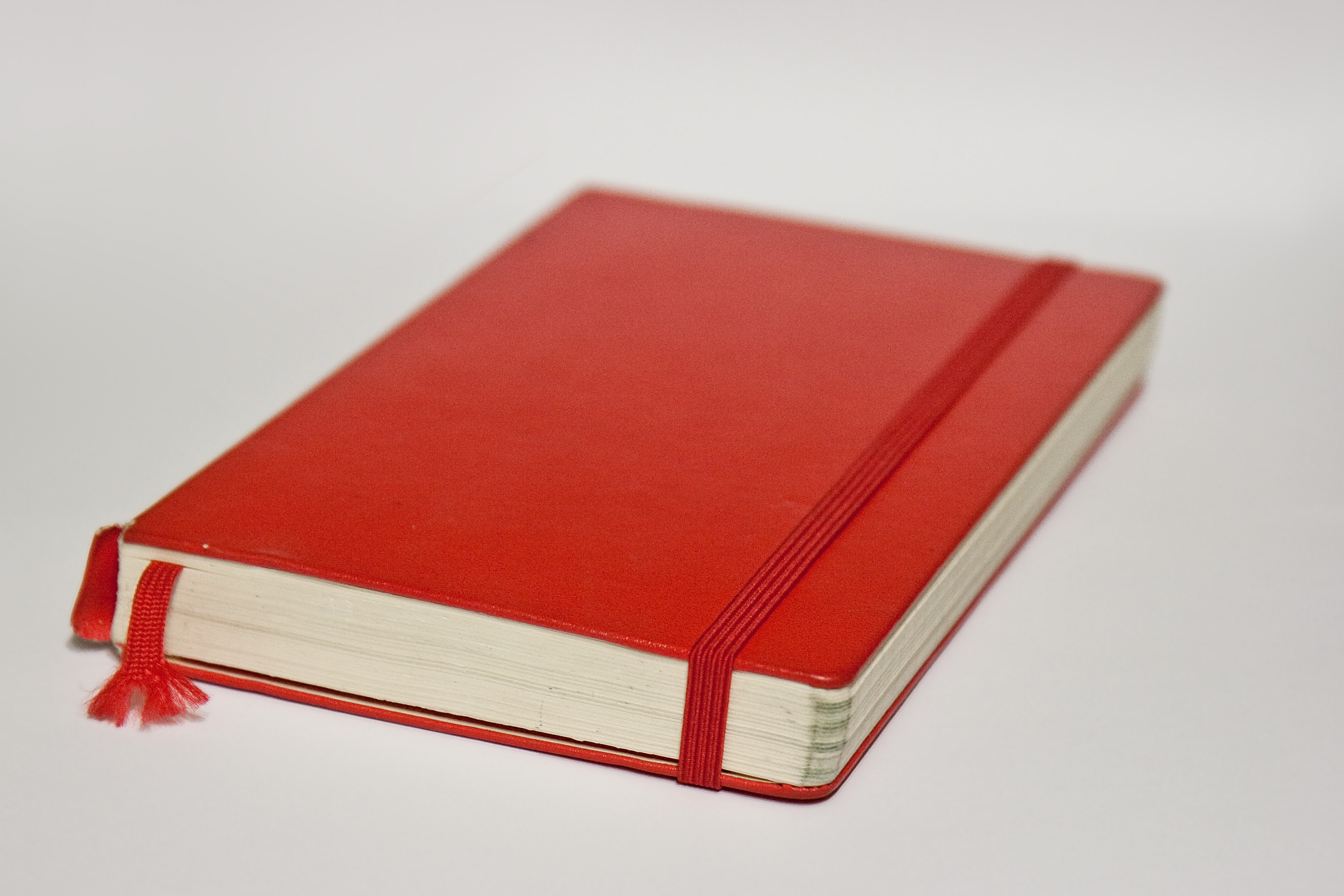
Moleskine notebook

Moleskine's notebooks are based on notebooks distributed in Paris during the 19th and 20th centuries, handmade by small French bookbinders who supplied the local stationery shops around the turn of the 20th century. They are fashioned after author Bruce Chatwin's descriptions of the notebooks he used. Over time, the Group’s sourcing strategy has led to the diversification of suppliers according to target markets in order to reduce the distance between production and sales areas. In 2024 strategic suppliers of products are located in China, Vietnam, Turkey and Ecuador. The paper used in Moleskine products is Forest Stewardship Council certified and acid-free. Since August 2010, all Moleskine products, offered to retailers in California and throughout the world, comply with the Safe Drinking Water and Toxic Enforcement Act of 1986. After concerns in 2008 about PVC traces in some notebooks, all items are now PVC-free.

=== Digital ===
Moleskine manufactures device covers that emulate the trademarked notebooks.

In August 2012, Moleskine partnered with Evernote to produce a digital-friendly notebook with specially designed pages and stickers for smartphone syncing.

In October 2012, Moleskine forayed into print on demand with Moleskine Photo Books, a collaboration with MILK Books that lets users upload their own photos into a Moleskine notebook-style photo book.

In 2016, Moleskine launched The Smart Writing Set with Evernote and Livescribe. The notebook costs approximately $200 and is able to automatically transfer notes from the notebook onto a laptop or smartphone.

=== Timepage ===
Timepage is a mobile planner and calendar app developed by Moleskine. It organizes events from calendars on mobile devices and syncs information, contact info, and weather forecasting. The app includes a Heat map calendar and timeline, and has included access to Uber.

=== Communities ===
The Moleskine brand is supported by worldwide communities of enthusiasts who write, sketch, paint and draw on Moleskine notebooks. Communities often share images of decorated pages through blogs, social networks or photo and video sharing sites as well as Moleskine's own service "MyMoleskine", through which customers can interact with company staff.

== Cafés ==
In early 2018, the company announced that it would be opening up Moleskine cafés in major cities such as Beijing, London, New York and Hamburg. The first café was opened in Milan, where the company is originally from.
