= Utz (film) =

- Directed by: George Sluizer
- Written by: Hugh Whitemore; Bruce Chatwin
- Based on: Utz by Bruce Chatwin
- Produced by: John Goldschmidt
- Starring: Armin Mueller-Stahl; Brenda Fricker; Peter Riegert; Paul Scofield
- Cinematography: Gérard Vandenberg
- Edited by: Lin Friedman
- Music by: Nicola Piovani
- Production companies: Viva Pictures; NDR; BBC Films; Academy Pictures
- Distributed by: Kinowelt Filmverleih (Germany); Viva Pictures (United Kingdom)
- Release dates: 21 February 1992 (Berlin International Film Festival); 13 March 1992 (United Kingdom); 28 January 1993 (Germany); 12 February 1993 (United States)
- Running time: 98 minutes
- Countries: Germany; Italy; United Kingdom
- Language: English
- Budget: £1.42 million

Utz is a 1992 drama film directed by George Sluizer, produced by John Goldschmidt and starring Brenda Fricker, Peter Riegert and Armin Mueller-Stahl. Mueller-Stahl won the Silver Bear for Best Actor at the 42nd Berlin International Film Festival.

The film is based on the 1988 novel Utz by Bruce Chatwin, who also co-wrote the screenplay.

== Premise ==
An art dealer goes to Prague after the death of a friend, Baron von Utz, to obtain the Baron's priceless Meissen porcelain collection. He meets an old friend, Orlik, who tells him about the Baron's past while he struggles to discover what happened to the collection.

== Cast ==
- Armin Mueller-Stahl as Baron Kaspar Joachim von Utz
- Brenda Fricker as Marta
- Peter Riegert as Marius Fisher
- Paul Scofield as Doctor Vaclav Orlik
- Gaye Brown as Ada Krasova
- Miriam Karlin as Grandmother
- Pauline Melville as Curator
- Adrian Brine as Head Waiter
- Peter Mackriel as Janitor
- Caroline Guthrie as Young Marta
- Clark Dunbar as Doctor
