= Real Bloomsbury =

2010 book by Nicholas Murray

- First edition
- Author: Nicholas Murray
- Language: English
- Subject: Local history, oral history
- Set in: Bloomsbury, London
- Published: Bridgend
- Publisher: Seren
- Publication date: 2010
- Publication place: United Kingdom
- Pages: 191
- ISBN: 9781854115263
- Dewey Decimal: 942.142

Real Bloomsbury is a 2010 local oral history book by Nicholas Murray on the district of Bloomsbury in the London Borough of Camden.

== Synopsis ==
Murray walks around the historic square mile of the Bloomsbury area among locals, students and tourists, alone or in the company of local characters.

== Reception ==
In The Independent, William Parker described the book as "amiably informative and well-illustrated...the ideal companion to any tour" and noted "there has always been a tradition of radical political and religious belief in Bloomsbury". The book was listed as the best book about London of 2010.
