= Yul Anderson =

American pianist, guitarist, singer, and inventor (1958–2021)

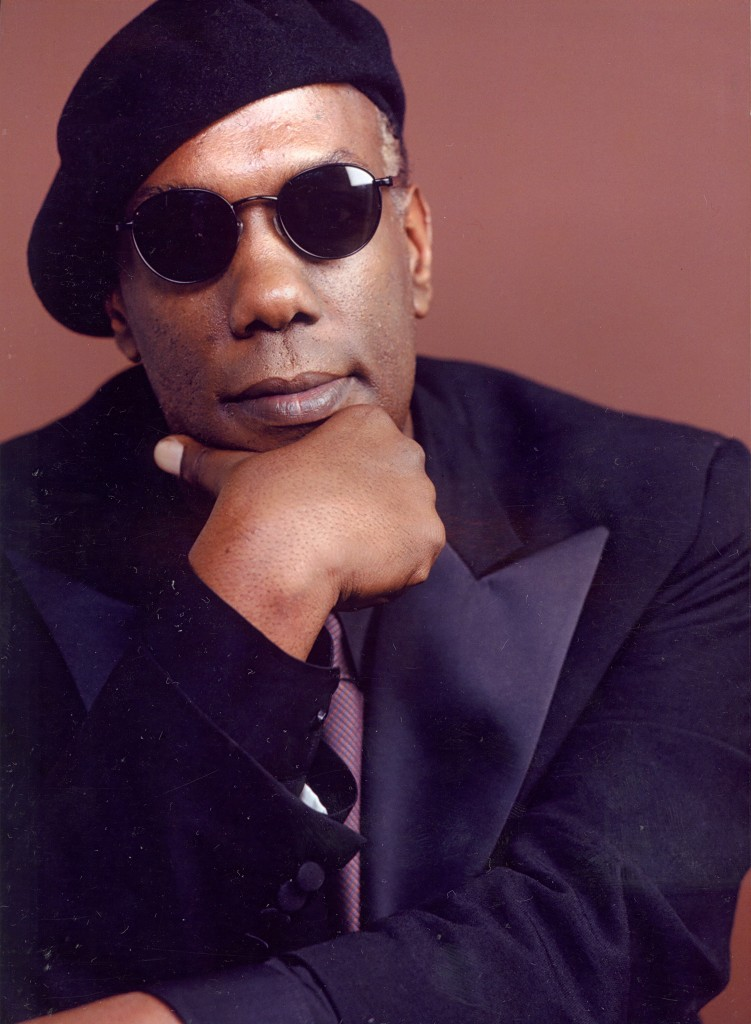
- Anderson c. 2009

Background information
- Born: April 23, 1958; Sacramento, California, U.S.
- Died: November 21, 2021 (aged 63) Sacramento, California, U.S.
- Genres: Jazz, Blues, Gospel, Western classical music, Improvisation
- Occupations: Pianist, Guitarist, Musician, Composer, Inventor
- Instruments: Piano, guitar, vocal
- Label: NBE Records
- Website: www.yulanderson.com

Yul Anderson (April 23, 1958 – November 21, 2021) was an American pianist, guitarist, singer and inventor, who played a blend of gospel, blues, and soul, as well as European classical music of the 18th and 19th century.

== Life and career ==
=== Musical creations ===
Anderson grew up in Vallejo, California. His mother was a social worker; his father, with the artist name John Kasandra, who has been dubbed "the father of urban blues" had hits back in the sixties with his records for Stax Records and later Capitol Records.

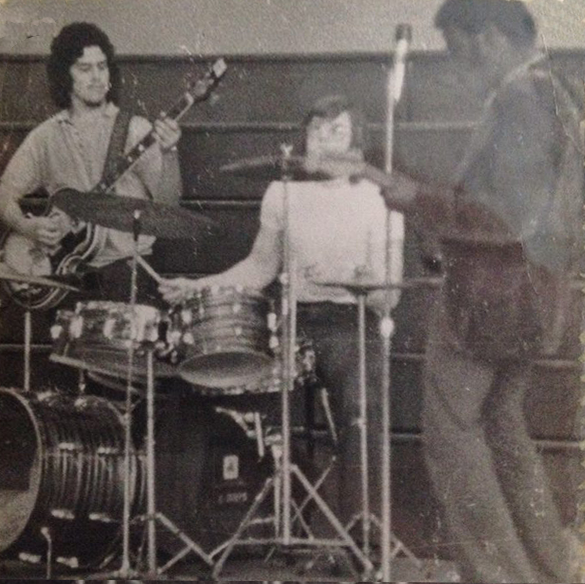
Yul Anderson plays the first Jimi Hendrix Memorial Concert, Vallejo, California, 1972

He taught himself to play the guitar when he was 8 years old, at age of 12 he was the youngest guitarist to open for groups such as Earthquake, Eddie Money and Ray Charles. At 14 he taught himself to play the piano.

Anderson's early musical influences were Gospel and Blues from Mahalia Jackson to B. B. King, Muddy Waters and Jimi Hendrix.

In addition to his work as a pianist Anderson has perfected his guitar playing and since 1972 pioneered and played the first "Jimi Hendrix Memorial Concert". He regularly gave guitar concerts with the title "Yul Anderson Plays Jimi Hendrix".

During his years at University of California, Davis, Anderson pioneered the International Multi-Cultural Festival at the University of California with extensive experience in generating and implementing ideas for international programs. He furthermore initiated and authored the University of California co-signer policy change correcting University of California's economic discrimination towards single women without co-signer for University loans, opening the door for single parent's loans and entry into University, college and higher education waiving the need for co-signers nationwide bringing about highly educated single parents to the labor force.

In May 1982, Anderson was granted the "Outstanding Senior Award" by UC Davis Chancellor James Henry Meyer. As part of the campus's Leadership Recognition Program, Outstanding Senior Awards are given to one individual from each department to acknowledge his/her contributions to the university and its quality of student life and to encourage his/her continued interest in the UC Davis campus. Determined by the respective departments, this "outstanding graduating senior" is selected based on excellent academic achievement, outstanding leadership activities, and most embodies the vision of UC Davis' Principles of Community.

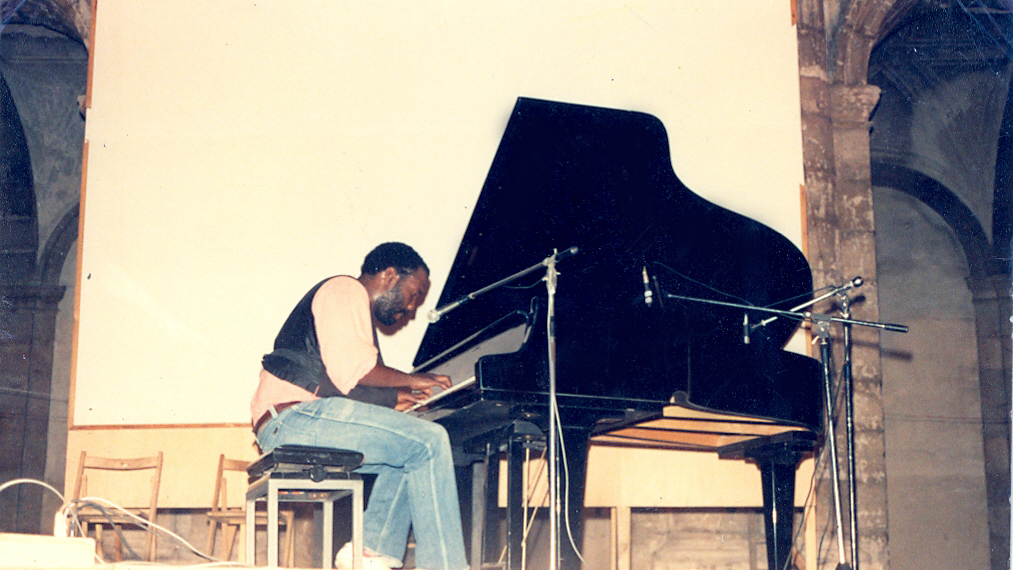
Yul Anderson Pioneer of Amnesty International fundraising through music performing first Human Rights December 10 concert, Rome, Italy, 1982

During the 1980s, Anderson went to Europe and took the initiative to establish a "Multi-Cultural Entertainment Circuit" inside Amnesty International while living in Florence, Italy. His idea has grown to host acts such as Bruce Springsteen, Tracy Chapman, U2, Sting and more. The first project was carried through by Yul Anderson, who via a very close coordinating working relationship with the organization's British Press Chief Richard Reoch, organized a long roll of successful benefit concerts in different European countries including extensive tours of Spain, France, Italy, Switzerland and Germany.

Anderson lived in Denmark from 1983. He played piano on the streets promoting his concerts performed in the most prestigious concert halls. He also became the first artist to perform live piano concerts in European Planetariums, beginning with a row of concerts in Tycho Brahe in Denmark and in Cosmonova in Sweden.

In 2002 John Malkovich used Anderson's solo piano version of Bob Dylan's "All Along the Watchtower" in his directorial debut movie The Dancer Upstairs featuring Oscar winner Javier Bardem.

In 2005 Anderson was nominated to the Nobel Peace Prize for his commitment and contribution to peace projects throughout the years.

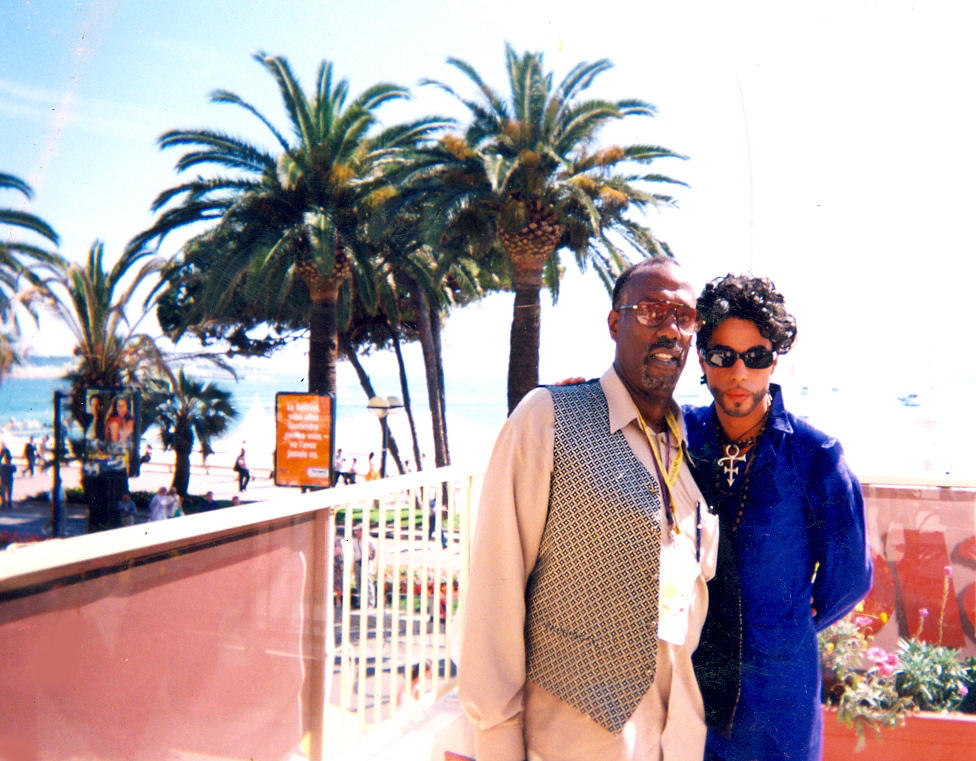
Yul Anderson Musician, CEO and Inventor of HaloSurround Circular Headphone met Prince during the celebration of Prince getting the rights to his name back

In his music Anderson blended influences from Hendrix and Dylan to Bach; during his performances he interpreted these influences as well as his own songs.

During his lifetime he was the inventor of the HaloSurround Circular Headphone.

He died in Sacramento, California, on November 21, 2021, at the age of 63.

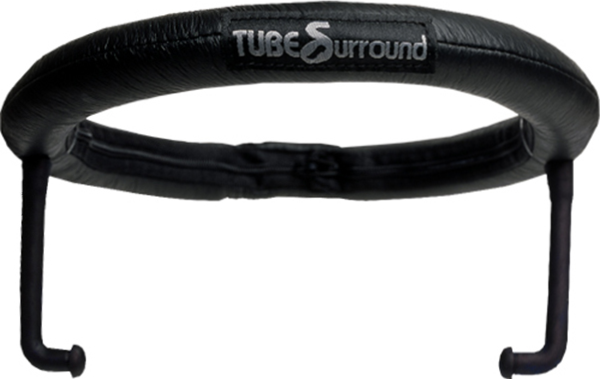
HaloSurround Headphone invented by Yul Anderson

== Discography ==
- "Nightbird", NBE Records
- "The Wind Starlight", NBE Records
- "Velvet Moon", NBE Records
- "Eyes of the Sun", NBE Records
- "Fragile Sunrise", NBE Records
- "Pre-recorded Instant CD of Yul Anderson Concert i Tivoli's Koncertsal, Copenhagen, Denmark, Saturday October 4th 2003", NBE Records
- "Dream Away", NBE Records
