= Photographs and Notebooks =

Book by Bruce Chatwin

- Author: Bruce Chatwin
- Language: English
- Genre: Art
- Publisher: Jonathan Cape
- Publication date: 1993
- Publication place: United Kingdom
- Media type: Print (Hardback & Paperback)
- Pages: 160
- ISBN: 0-224-03654-8
- OCLC: 29676969

Photographs and Notebooks is a collection of British author Bruce Chatwin's photographs and notebooks that were made during his life when he was working on his various novels and travel books. It was published posthumously in 1993 by Jonathan Cape.
