= Bloomsbury and the Poets =

Real Bloomsbury
- Author: Nicholas Murray
- Language: English
- Subjects: Local history, oral history
- Set in: Bloomsbury, London
- Published: Presteigne
- Publisher: Rack Press
- Publication date: 2014
- Publication place: United Kingdom
- Media type: Print
- ISBN: 0992765463

Bloomsbury and the Poets is a 2014 book by Nicholas Murray.

== Synopsis ==
The book details the history of literature in the Bloomsbury district of London, including the Bloomsbury Group.

== Reception ==
In The Spectator the book was praised as 'a delight' by Wynn Wheldon while in the New Welsh Review the book was reviewed by Amy McCauley who wrote 'The writing is energetic, witty, and authoritative, demonstrating an astonishing breadth of reading and research'.
