= Viktor Růžička =

Czech cinematographer

Viktor Růžička (10 March 1943 – 13 February 2014) was a Czech cinematographer.

== Selected filmography ==
- Balada pro banditu (1978)
- Drsná planina (1979)
- Jen si tak trochu písknout (1980)
- Tajemství hradu v Karpatech (1981)
- Jako zajíci (1981)
- Poslední leč (1981)
- Má láska s Jakubem (1982)
- Šílený kankán (1982)
- Straka v hrsti (1983)
- Vrak (1983)
- Prodavač humoru (1984)
- Zastihla mě noc (1985)
- Čarovné dědictví (1985)
- Dva na koni, jeden na oslu (1986)
- Cobra Verde (1987)
- Marta a já (1990)
- Lepšie byť bohatý a zdravý ako chudobný a chorý (1992)
- Nesmrtelná teta (1993)
