= Songline =

Aboriginal Australian belief and practice

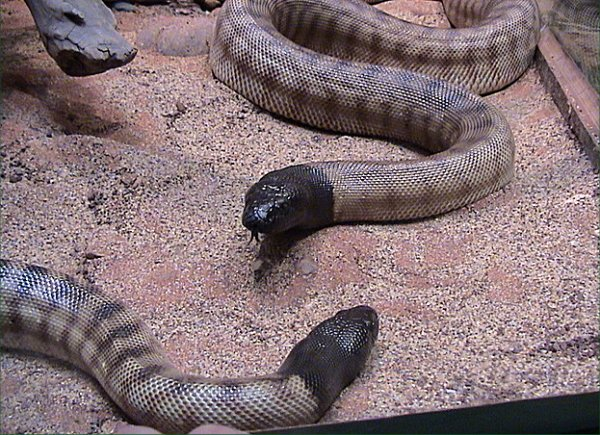
Blackheaded python

A songline, also called dreaming track, is one of the paths across the land (or sometimes the sky) within the animist belief systems of the Aboriginal cultures of Australia which mark the route followed by localised "creator-beings" in the Dreaming. The paths of the songlines are recorded in traditional song cycles, stories, dance, and art, and are often the basis of ceremonies.

== Description ==
The Dreaming, or the Dreamtime, has been described as "a sacred narrative of Creation that is seen as a continuous process that links Aboriginal people to their origins". Ancestors are believed to play a large role in the establishment of sacred sites as they traversed the continent long ago. Animals were created in the Dreaming, and also played a part in creation of the lands and heavenly bodies. Songlines connect places and Creation events, and the ceremonies associated with those places. Oral history about places and the journeys are carried in song cycles, and each Aboriginal person has obligations to their birthplace. The songs become the basis of the ceremonies that are enacted in those specific places along the songlines.

A songline has been called a "dreaming track", as it marks a route across the land or sky followed by one of the creator-beings or ancestors in the Dreaming.

A knowledgeable person is able to navigate across the land by repeating the words of the song, which describe the location of landmarks, waterholes, and other natural phenomena. In some cases, the paths of the creator-beings are said to be evident from their marks, or petrosomatoglyphs, on the land, such as large depressions in the land which are said to be their footprints.

By singing the songs in the appropriate sequence, Aboriginal people could navigate vast distances, often travelling through the deserts of Australia's interior. The continent of Australia contains an extensive system of songlines, some of which are of a few kilometres, whilst others traverse hundreds of kilometres through lands of many different Aboriginal peoples — peoples who may speak markedly different languages and have different cultural traditions. One songline marks a 3,500-kilometre (2,200 mi) route connecting the Central Desert Region with the east coast, to the place now called Byron Bay. Desert peoples travelled to the ocean to observe fishing practices, and coastal people travelled inland to sacred sites such as Uluru and Kata Tjuta.

Since a songline can span the lands of several different language groups, different parts of the song are said to be in those different languages. Languages are not a barrier because the melodic contour of the song describes the nature of the land over which the song passes. The rhythm is what is crucial to understanding the song. Listening to the song of the land is the same as walking on this songline and observing the land. Songlines have been described as a "cultural passport" which, when sung in the language of a particular region and mob, shows respect to the people of that country.

Neighbouring groups are connected because the song cycles criss-cross all over the continent. All Aboriginal groups traditionally share beliefs in the ancestors and related laws; people from different groups interacted with each other based on their obligations along the songlines.

In some cases, a songline has a particular direction, and walking the wrong way along a songline may be a sacrilegious act. Aboriginal people regard all land as sacred, and the songs must be continually sung to keep the land "alive". Their "connection to country" describes a strong and complex relationship with the land of their ancestors, or "mob". Aboriginal identity often links to their language groups and traditional country of their ancestors. Songlines not only map routes across the continent and pass on culture, but also express connectedness to country.

Songlines are often passed down in families, passing on important knowledge and cultural values.

Molyneaux and Vitebsky note that the Dreaming Spirits "also deposited the spirits of unborn children and determined the forms of human society", thereby establishing tribal law and totemic paradigms.

== Descriptions and definitions ==
Anthropologist Robert Tonkinson described Mardu songlines in his 1978 monograph The Mardudjara Aborigines - Living The Dream In Australia's Desert.

Songlines Singing is an essential element in most Mardudjara ritual performances because the songline follows in most cases the direction of travel of the beings concerned and highlights cryptically their notable as well as mundane activities. Most songs, then, have a geographical as well as mythical referent, so by learning the songline men become familiar with literally thousands of sites even though they have never visited them; all become part of their cognitive map of the desert world.

In his 1987 book The Songlines, British novelist and travel writer Bruce Chatwin describes the songlines as:

... the labyrinth of invisible pathways which meander all over Australia and are known to Europeans as "Dreaming-tracks" or "Songlines"; to the Aboriginals as the "Footprints of the Ancestors" or the "Way of the Lore".

Aboriginal Creation myths tell of the legendary totemic being who wandered over the continent in the Dreamtime, singing out the name of everything that crossed their path - birds, animals, plants, rocks, waterholes - and so singing the world into existence.

Margo Ngawa Neale, senior Indigenous art and history curator at the National Museum of Australia, says:

Songlines can be visualised as corridors or pathways of knowledge that crisscross the entire continent, sky and water. Songlines, sometimes referred to as dreaming tracks, link sites and hold stories, known as story places, which are read into the natural features of the land. These sites of significance, formed by ancestral beings, are like libraries, storing critical knowledge for survival. The stories at significant sites contain knowledge that instruct on social behaviour, gender relations or where water or food can be sourced.

== Examples ==
- The Yolngu people of Arnhem Land in the Northern Territory tell the story of Barnumbirr, a creator-being associated with the planet Venus, who came from the island of Baralku in the East, guiding the first humans to Australia, and then flew across the land from East to West, naming and creating the animals, plants, and natural features of the land.
- The Yarralin people of the Victoria River Valley venerate the spirit Walujapi as the Dreaming Spirit of the black-headed python. Walujapi is said to have carved a snakelike track along a cliff-face and deposited an impression of her buttocks when she sat establishing camp. Both signs are currently discernible.
- The Native Cat Dreaming Spirits who are said to have commenced their journey at the sea and to have moved north into the Simpson Desert, traversing as they did so the lands of the Aranda, Kaititja, Ngalia, Kukatja and Unmatjera. Each people sing the part of the Native Cat Dreaming relating to the songlines for which they are bound in a territorial relationship of reciprocity.
- In the Sydney region, because of the soft Sydney sandstone, valleys often end in a canyon or cliff, and so travelling along the ridge lines was much easier than travelling in the valleys. Thus, the songlines tend to follow the ridge lines, and this is also where much of the sacred art, such as the Sydney Rock Engravings, is located. In contrast, in many other parts of Australia, the songlines tend to follow valleys, where water may be found more easily.
- Songlines have been linked to Aboriginal art sites in the Wollemi National Park in New South Wales.

== See also ==
- Aboriginal passport
- Australian Aboriginal culture
- Australian Aboriginal religion and mythology
- Ethnogeology
- Ley lines
- Method of loci
- Story arc
- "Songlines (Alphaville video)", inspired in part by the Aboriginal songlines
- "The Dreaming (song)", inspired in part by the Aboriginal songlines
