= Priscilla: The Hidden Life of an Englishwoman in Wartime France =

2013 book by Nicholas Shakespeare

- First edition
- Author: Nicholas Shakespeare
- Publisher: Harvill Secker
- Publication date: 2013

Priscilla: The Hidden Life of an Englishwoman in Wartime France is a book by Nicholas Shakespeare first published in 2013. The book tells the story of the author's enigmatic aunt, variously known as Vicomtesse Priscilla Doynel de la Sausserie, Priscilla Mais, and Simone Vernier, who had spent time in France during the Second World War. Shakespeare had believed that Priscilla was a hero of the resistance during the war, but after her death he uncovered the truth that she was a lover to a high-ranking Nazi official. Lucy Lethbridge, writing in the Guardian, concludes that Shakespeare's investigation shows "the struggle for survival is rarely as noble as comfortable peacetime generations might wish it to be".
