= The Songlines =

1987 book by Bruce Chatwin

- First edition
- Author: Bruce Chatwin
- Language: English
- Publisher: Franklin Press
- Publication date: 1987
- Publication place: United Kingdom
- Media type: Print (Hardback & Paperback)

The Songlines is a 1987 book written by British novelist and travel writer Bruce Chatwin about the songs of Aboriginal Australians and their connections to nomadic travel. A roman à clef that combines novel, travelogue, and memoir, Chatwin blends elements of fiction and non-fiction to describe a trip to Australia's Northern Territory in search of a better understanding of Aboriginal culture and religion, the Aboriginal land rights movement, and the Australian Outback more generally. The book is Chatwin's most famous work, a best seller upon publication in both the United States and United Kingdom.

== Synopsis and other details ==
The book is centered around a British writer named "Bruce" who travels to Alice Springs, Australia, to join a land surveyor mapping the location of a proposed 1,500 Kilometre railway line to be constructed from Alice Springs to Darwin, Australia. Specifically, the narrator befriends "Arkady," a local who is tasked by the rail company with conferring with local Aboriginals to understand which landscapes are considered sacred in Aboriginal culture and thus should be avoided. Arkady, Bruce and a group of Aboriginal locals travel in a Toyota Land Cruiser through Outback Australia, and the first half of the book chronicles these various encounters. Bruce eventually becomes stranded in a small, remote Aboriginal village for several weeks due to heavy rains, and spends his time musing on the nature of man as nomad and settler, connecting his Australian experiences with those of other nomadic cultures he experienced in his travels around the world. Chatwin develops a thesis about the primordial nature of Aboriginal song and its connections with the evolutionary conditions under which human populations evolved. The writing engages the hard conditions of life for present-day Indigenous Australians, including the fraught and contradictory relationship with White Australians, while appreciating the art and culture of the people for whom the Songlines are the touchstone of reality.

While the names are changed, most of the characters and places in the story are based on real-life counterparts, although Chatwin later said the book should be considered a work of fiction. According to Chatwin's biographer Nicholas Shakespeare, Chatwin spent a total of 9 weeks in Central Australia, first in February 1983 and returning again in March of 1984. The latter trip was organized ostensibly around a March 10 appearance at the Adelaide Writer's Week Festival where Chatwin appeared on a panel entitled "Fact, Fiction, Truth?" alongside writers Blanche d'Alpuget, Thomas Keneally, Barbara Jefferis, and Jean-Marc Lovay. Later that day, Chatwin's friend and fellow writer Salman Rushdie also gave a reading at the festival, and after the festival Chatwin and Rushdie travelled together to Alice Springs, where they rented a Land Cruiser and climbed Ayers Rock. Looking to continue research on The Songlines, Chatwin was able to secure a permit to stay in the Aboriginal Village of Kintore for a period for two weeks, starting on March 18, although upon arriving found it difficult to speak with the local residents due to barriers in language and his outsider status. Preliminary work on the rail line from Alice Springs to Darwin was being planned by the federal government as early as 1981 and had been a major topic of debate in Australian politics during that time, although by mid 1983 the project had been officially cancelled (it eventually was completed in 2004). Friends and observers later surmised that the "fiction" label was largely a means to avoid questions about the veracity of various quotes and ideas presented in the work, especially around a topic as sensitive as Aboriginal mythology.

After returning to England, Chatwin spent the next several years working to finish the book while struggling with the debilitating complications of what he (correctly) suspected was the HIV virus. Rushdie later remarked, "That book was an obsession too great for him, a monkey he carried around on his back. His illness did him a favour, got him free of it. Otherwise, he would have gone on writing it for ten years."

The Songlines became a bestseller in the United Kingdom and in the United States. The book was nominated for the Thomas Cook Travel Award, but Chatwin requested that it be withdrawn from consideration, saying the work was fictional. After its publication, Chatwin befriended the composer Kevin Volans, who was inspired to base a theatre score on the book. The project evolved into an opera, The Man with Footsoles of Wind (1993).

=== Thesis ===
Chatwin asserts that language started as song, and in the Aboriginal Dreamtime, it sang the land into existence for the conscious mind and memory. As you sing the land, the tree, the rock, the path, they come to be, and the singers are one with them. Chatwin combines evidence from Aboriginal culture with modern ideas on human evolution, and argues that on the African Savannah, we were a migratory species hunted by a dominant feline predator. Our wanderings spread "songlines" across the globe (generally from southwest to northeast), eventually reaching Australia, where they are now preserved in the world's oldest living culture.

== Reviews and criticisms ==
Many contemporary reviews praised Chatwin's prose and commented on aspects of his fictionalisation and research.

The New York Times 1987 review praised the book as "[Chatwin's] bravest book yet", observing that it "engages the full range of the writer's passions" and that "each of his books has been a different delight [and] feast of style and form", but noted that Chatwin failed to bridge the "inevitable" "distance between a modern sensibility and an ancient one" in representing the Aboriginal relationship to their land, and did not sufficiently clearly establish the nature of the Songlines themselves, despite Chatwin's "quoting pertinently" from Giambattista Vico and Heidegger, and while acknowledging the difficulty of so doing, concluded that he ought to have "found some way to make the songs accessible" to the reader. Chatwin's "vision", though "exhilarating", could also at times seem "naive" and "unhistorical"; the review concluded that, nevertheless, Chatwin "remains one of our clearest, most vibrant writers".

John Bayley, in a review for the London Review of Books, called the book "compulsively memorable", but observed the difficulty encountered by the anthropologist in his representation of a culture such as the Aboriginal one Chatwin dealt with: "describing [their] life and beliefs... falsifies them [and] creates a picture of unreality... seductively comprehensible to others"; Chatwin "makes no comparison or comment, and draws no conclusions, but his reader has the impression that anthropologists can't do other than mislead." He however praised "the poetry" of Chatwin's "remarkable pages"; and considered that "the book is a masterpiece".

In The Irish Times, Julie Parsons, after consideration of the difficulties encountered by Chatwin—"born, raised and educated in the European tradition"—in apprehending the nature of the relationship between the Aborigines and the land on which they live, notes that as the reader follows his narrative, they "realise the impossibility of Chatwin's project. The written word cannot express this world", but the book is read nevertheless "with pleasure and fascination. We read it to learn how little we know."

Rory Stewart, in The New York Review of Books, observed that the book "transformed English travel writing", praising his "concision" and "erudition", and acknowledging Chatwin's inspirational character and the view of The Songlines as "almost... a sacred text", leading Stewart and others to travel and "arrange... life and meaning"; he noted that whereas his own travels were at times "repetitive, boring, frustrating", "this is not the way that Chatwin describes the world", nor experienced it. Despite Stewart's conclusion that "today... [his] fictions seem more transparent" and that Chatwin's "personality... learning... myths, even his prose, are less hypnotizing", he considers that "he remains a great writer, of deep and enduring importance." Of particular note was Chatwin's representation of the Aboriginal people he encountered; despite the hardships of their daily existence—sickness, addiction, unemployment—"they are not victims... they emerge as figures of scope, and challenging autonomy."

In 2000 Chatwin's biographer Nicholas Shakespeare quoted Toly Sawenko (on whom the character Arkady is supposedly based): "Bruce... hadn't sat down with any Aborigine. He gets information second hand and repeats it. Aboriginal people are capable of dealing with the world in a philosophical way. The problem was, he just wasn't there long enough, he didn't get involved at any depth."

In 2006 author Debbie Lisle criticised the book, writing "Charges of 'false' or 'mis' representations come from... social scientists and locals claiming to know the Aboriginal culture better than Chatwin, either because they rely on academically rigorous research, or because they have lived and worked with Aboriginal communities for a long time. In effect, The Songlines reveals that Chatwin is a poor anthropologist (his visit too brief, his ethnography too superficial) whose travel writing is limited by his Western, neocolonial privilege."

== Literary references ==
The character Arkady refers to Australia as "the country of lost children". This was used as the title for Peter Pierce's 1999 book The Country of Lost Children: An Australian Anxiety.

== See also ==
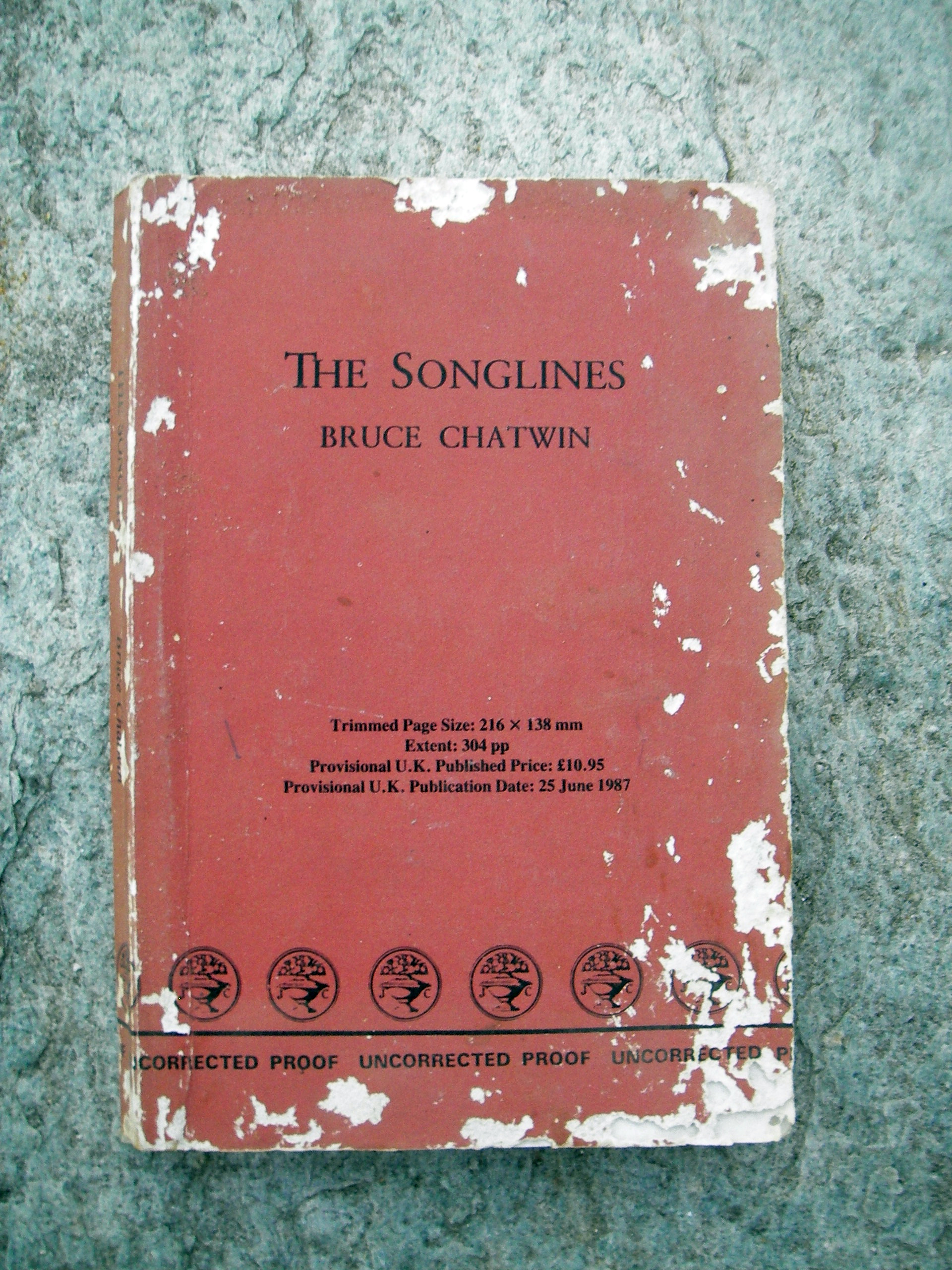
A damaged proof copy

- Ethnogeology
- Dreaming (Australian Aboriginal art)
- Aboriginal title on land rights
- Neo-colonial science
