= The Dancer Upstairs (film) =

2002 film by John Malkovich

- Theatrical release poster
- Directed by: John Malkovich
- Written by: Nicholas Shakespeare
- Based on: The Dancer Upstairs by Nicholas Shakespeare
- Produced by: Andrés Vicente Gómez; John Malkovich
- Starring: Javier Bardem; Juan Diego Botto; Laura Morante; Elvira Mínguez; Wolframio Sinué
- Cinematography: José Luis Alcaine
- Edited by: Mario Battistel
- Music by: Alberto Iglesias; Madredeus; Yul Anderson
- Production companies: Mr. Mudd; Antena 3 Televisión; Via Digital
- Distributed by: LolaFilms (Spain); Fox Searchlight Pictures (English-speaking territories, France and Italy)
- Release dates: 11 January 2002 (Sundance); 6 September 2002 (Venice); 20 September 2002 (Spain); 2 May 2003 (United States)
- Running time: 134 minutes
- Countries: Spain; United States
- Languages: English; Quechua; Spanish
- Box office: $5.2 million

The Dancer Upstairs is a 2002 Spanish-American crime thriller film produced and directed by John Malkovich (in his directorial debut), and starring Javier Bardem, Juan Diego Botto and Laura Morante. The film is an adaptation of the 1995 novel The Dancer Upstairs by Nicholas Shakespeare, who also wrote the screenplay.

== Plot ==
In an unnamed Latin American republic, in a remote mountainous region of the country, police sergeant Agustin Rejas, a former lawyer who left a job with a prestigious firm to join the police, is in charge of a little used checkpoint. When a pickup truck is stopped at the checkpoint, Rejas grows suspicious of the truck's occupants. He questions a passenger, who claims to be a laborer but is obviously educated and well spoken. While Rejas is momentarily distracted, a corrupt subordinate solicits a bribe and allows the party to leave.

Several years later, Rejas has been promoted to lieutenant and resides in the capital with his wife and teenage daughter. Struggling to make ends meet on a police salary, Rejas visits his daughter's ballet teacher, Yolanda, to pay a long-overdue bill. Rejas strikes up a friendship with Yolanda, who tells him that his daughter has a special gift for dance. He finds her a refreshing change from his flighty, self-centered wife, and he is captivated after seeing her dance alone in her studio. The two stop short of beginning an affair - for now.

While working a security detail at a diplomatic reception, Rejas is recognized by lawyer Tristan Calderon, a shadowy figure with ties to narcotics traffickers and the new presidential administration. Meanwhile, Rejas and his subordinate Sucre discover a series of dead dogs hanging from lampposts, all affixed with placards referencing Maoist ideology and a “President Ezequiel.” Shortly thereafter, the name Ezequiel is invoked during a suicide bombing in the capital.

Fearing that political instability will invite democratic backsliding, the chief of police promotes Rejas to captain and tasks him with investigating Ezequiel within the bounds of judicial process. Rejas and his team determine that Ezequiel is the nom de guerre of a Maoist terrorist leader responsible for a series of atrocities committed in the country's mountains, which were overlooked due to a breakdown in central authority toward the end of military rule. Rejas quickly identifies a prime suspect: Edgardo Rivas, a former academic who considers himself the “fourth flame of Communism.” Rejas recognizes Rivas as the purported laborer he interrogated at the police checkpoint in the mountains. Ezequiel wages a terror campaign in the capital, and after two senior officials are assassinated, Calderon, now the president's chief adviser, imposes martial law. The Ezequiel investigation is transferred to a military death squad. When Rejas protests, Calderon allows his investigation to continue, but with military oversight.

Rejas and his investigators locate a videotape that confirms Ezequiel's identity as Rivas and suggests that his hideout is located on one of two residential streets in the capital. Rejas conceals this discovery from Calderon, allowing the police to bring the investigation to a close without military interference. After an exhaustive investigation, his team locates Rivas’ hideout in an upper level of the building housing Yolanda's ballet studio. Rejas succeeds in apprehending Rivas and his associates without bloodshed, but learns, to his astonishment, that Yolanda is one of Rivas’ operatives.

Rejas ensures that the Ezequiel suspects receive due process, becoming a hero to the political opposition and a plausible contender for the presidency. Meanwhile, Rivas, Yolanda, and their associates are sentenced to life imprisonment under harsh conditions. Rejas meets with Calderon and offers to refrain from a presidential candidacy in exchange for the commutation of Yolanda's sentence. Calderon agrees to the deal and informs Rejas that, to save face, the president will soon appoint him to a judgeship. Before departing, he marvels at Rejas’ willingness to turn down the presidency, revealing a letter from Yolanda in which she permanently rejects Rejas. The film concludes as Rejas arrives at his daughter's ballet recital, catching his breath as he sees her dance.

== Cast ==
- Javier Bardem as Detective Agustin Rejas
- Juan Diego Botto as Sucre
- Laura Morante as Yolanda
- Elvira Mínguez as Llosa
- Wolframio Sinué as Santiago
- Abel Folk as President Ezequiel
- Alexandra Lencastre as Sylvina Rejas
- Oliver Cotton as Merino
- Luís Miguel Cintra as Calderón
- Natalia Dicenta as Marina
- John Malkovich (uncredited) as Abimael Guzmán

== Production ==
The film was shot in Porto, Portugal and Quito, Ecuador. The original theatrical release included a quick scene (about 2–3 seconds) of a map of Lima, Peru. This scene is deleted from the DVD release.

A lamppost sign reads: "When I hear the word culture, I reach for my pistol." This is a quotation usually mis-attributed to Nazi leader Hermann Göring.

The seized videotape is labeled "Estado de sitio"; this happens to be the Spanish title for the film State of Siege by Costa Gavras. There turns out to be an execution on the tape. Later, portions of Gavras' film itself are also seen on the tape.

The wisecrack joke about "pubes on a coke can" is a reference to the Judge Clarence Thomas confirmation hearings.

=== Historical basis ===
The story is inspired by the Peruvian Maoist guerrilla organization Shining Path. Its leader Abimael Guzmán, who was known by the nom de guerre President Gonzalo, was captured in an apartment above a ballet studio in the capital Lima in 1992. The ballet teacher Yolanda was based on Maritza Garrido Lecca, the woman in whose apartment Guzmán was found. Bardem's character was inspired by Benedicto Jiménez and General Antonio Ketin Vidal, the leading figures responsible for Guzmán's capture. Tristan Calderon is based on Vladimiro Montesinos, the de facto head of the Peruvian National Intelligence Service, who had also been an attorney for drug dealers.

== Awards and accolades ==
- 2002 - Venice International Film Festival
  - Won Rota Soundtrack Award for Alberto Iglesias
- 2002 - Chicago International Film Festival
  - Nomination for the New Directors Competition at John Malkovich
- 2004 - Political Film Society
  - Nomination for the PFS Award
