= What Am I Doing Here (book) =

1988 short story collection by Bruce Chatwin

- First edition
- Author: Bruce Chatwin
- Language: English
- Genre: Travel
- Publisher: Jonathan Cape
- Publication date: 1988
- Publication place: United Kingdom
- Media type: Print (Hardback & Paperback)
- Pages: 384
- ISBN: 0-09-976981-6
- OCLC: 40610900

What Am I Doing Here (1988) is a book by British author Bruce Chatwin containing a collection of essays, profiles and travel stories from his life. It was the last book published during Chatwin's life and draws on various experiences from it. These experiences include trekking in Nepal, sailing down the Volga, interviewing Madeleine Vionnet and making a film with Werner Herzog.
