= Utz (novel) =

1988 novel by Bruce Chatwin

- First edition
- Author: Bruce Chatwin
- Language: English
- Published: 1988 (Jonathan Cape)
- Publication place: United Kingdom
- Media type: Print (Hardback & Paperback)
- Pages: 128
- ISBN: 0-09-977001-6
- OCLC: 43674629

Utz is a novel written by the British author Bruce Chatwin, first published in 1988. The novel follows the fortunes of Kaspar Utz who lives in Czechoslovakia during the Cold War. Utz is a collector of Meissen porcelain and finds a way to travel outside the Eastern Bloc to acquire new pieces. Whilst in the West, Utz often considers defecting but he would be unable to take his collection with him and so, a prisoner of his collection, he is unable to leave. Utz was shortlisted for the 1988 Booker Prize.

== See also ==
- Utz (film)
- Utz (2009 radio play)
