= Ethnogeology =

Ethnogeology is the study of how geological features are understood by indigenous communities around the globe from a "place-based" perspective, in specific reference to traditional knowledge and to the stories and ideas about the Earth that were passed down through traditions and the wisdom of elders. The focus in past research tended to be on the unique ideas and knowledge of minorities and distinct cultural groups, and how this relates to universal and cross cultural knowledge discovered by humanity as a whole. Knowledge claims that are based more on universal discoveries and natural science can be found in the subjects of philosophy, chemistry, physics, biology, mathematics, and geology. The term "ethnogeology" first enters the geological literature through the work of John Murray of the University of Manitoba in Winnipeg, Canada in the mid-1990s by virtue of his studies of the Northern Cree First Nation geological worldviews in the Province of Manitoba in Canada. At that time, a cadre of geologists and geoscience educators - particularly Dr. Steven Semken of Navajo Community College in Shiprock, New Mexico and colleagues - were examining the interesting connections among Native American traditional knowledge, geoscience concepts, and the unique vision of planet Earth's history as articulated by indigenous ethnogeological wisdom (see references below).

One global example of geological knowledge over thousands of years is the making of rock tools and arrowheads. Worldwide, humans have shaped specific kinds of rock into various tools. These artifacts are evidence that there was some basic knowledge of which rocks were hard enough and easy enough to chip into various useful forms. Ancient humans discovered certain rock formations that provided them with materials to work with. Flint, obsidian, chert, copper and quartz were some examples of useful rocks or minerals for thousands of years.

In addition, humans have always used natural, high, and dry ridges for land transportation. Natural water ways were used for boats, travel, exploration, and trade. Various types of natural elements were used around the Earth for centuries. Gold and silver are prized for jewelry and trade. Good soil is needed for agriculture. Mountains and rivers provided natural boundaries, defence, and borders for various political groups.

== See also ==
- archaeoastronomy
- Indigenous peoples of the Americas
- prehistory
- oral history
- songlines
- stone tools
