= Nicholas Murray (biographer) =

British author

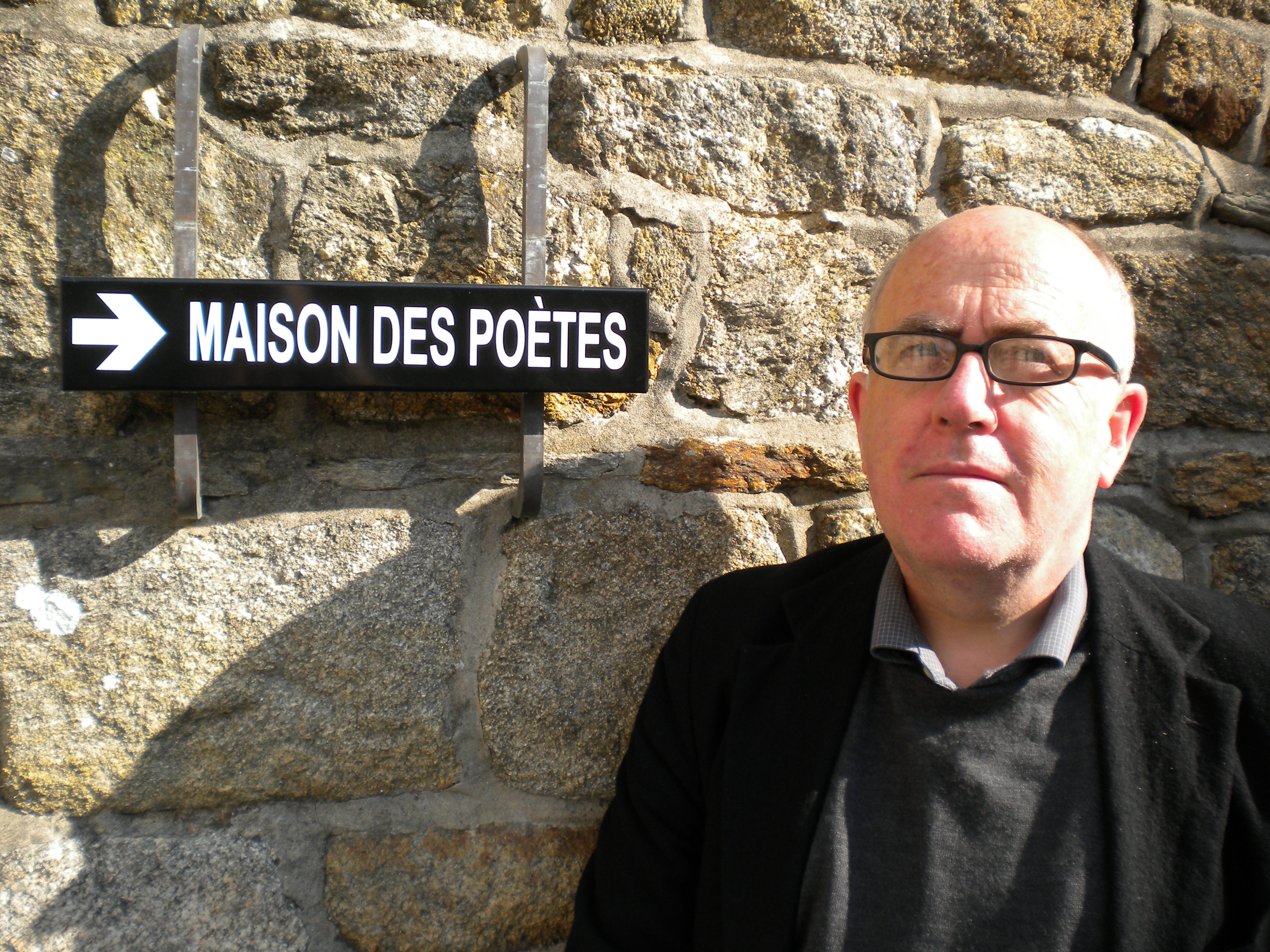
Nicholas Murray in 2010

Nicholas Murray is a British literary biographer, poet and journalist.

== Career ==
Nicholas Murray is a freelance author based in Wales and London. Born in Liverpool in 1952, he was educated at St Mary’s College, Crosby, and graduated from Liverpool University in 1973 in English Language and Literature.

He is the author of several literary biographies including lives of Franz Kafka, Aldous Huxley, Bruce Chatwin, Andrew Marvell and Matthew Arnold, several collections of poems, and two novels. His biography of Matthew Arnold was a New York Times Notable Book of the Year in 1997 and his biography of Aldous Huxley was shortlisted for the Marsh Biography Award in 2003. His biography of Franz Kafka has been translated into nine languages.

He is a regular contributor of poems, essays and reviews to a wide range of newspapers and literary magazines. In 1996 he was the inaugural Gladys Krieble Delmas Fellow at the British Library Centre for the Book and he is a Fellow of the Welsh Academy and vice-chair of English PEN’s Writers in Translation Committee. He has lectured at literary festivals and universities in Britain, Europe and the United States. From 2003-2007 he was Royal Literary Fund Fellow at Queen Mary University, London and from 2010-2011 an RLF Fellow at King's College, London. He is a tutor in biography and creative non-fiction at the City Literary Institute in London.

So Spirited a Town: Visions and Versions of Liverpool was published by Liverpool University Press in November 2007 and a book about the British Victorian travellers and explorers, A Corkscrew is Most Useful, was published by Little, Brown in April 2008. In November 2010 his book about Bloomsbury in the “Real” series was published: Real Bloomsbury (Seren, ISBN 9781854115263). His book about the British poets of the First World War, The Red Sweet Wine of Youth (Little, Brown) appeared in February 2011 and his verse broadside against the British coalition government, Get Real! also appeared in February 2011. In April 2012 Acapulco: New and Selected Poems appeared from Melos Press. His latest book is Of Earth, Water, Air and Fire: animal poems (Melos, 2013)

Murray also runs a small poetry imprint, Rack Press, and writes the Bibliophilicblogger literary blog.

In August 2015, Murray was one of 20 authors of Poets for Corbyn, an anthology of poems endorsing Jeremy Corbyn's campaign in the Labour leadership election.

== Works ==
Literary Biographies

- Bruce Chatwin (Border Lines, Seren, 1993)
- A Life of Matthew Arnold (Hodder & Stoughton, 1996)
- After Arnold: Culture and Accessibility (British Library, 1997)
- World Enough and Time: The Life of Andrew Marvell (Little, Brown, 1999)
- Aldous Huxley: An English Intellectual (Little, Brown, 2002)
- Kafka (Yale University Press, 2004)
- The Red Sweet Wine of Youth: British Poets of the First World War (Little, Brown, 2011)
- Bloomsbury and the Poets (Rack Press Editions, 2014)

Poetry Collections

- Plausible Fictions (Rack Press, 1995)
- The Narrators (Rack Press, 2006)
- Get Real! (Rack Press, 2011)
- Acapulco: New and Selected Poems (The Melos Press, 2012)
- Of Earth, Water, Air and Fire: Animal Poems (The Melos Press, 2013)
- Trench Feet (Rack Press, 2014)
- The Secrets of the Sea (The Melos Press, 2015)
- The Migrant Ship (The Melos Press, 2016)
- A Dog’s Brexit (The Melos Press, 2017)
- The Museum of Truth (The Melos Press, 2018)
- The Yellow Wheelbarrow (The Melos Press, 2019)
- A Quartet in Winter (Rack Press, 2020)
- City Lights (The Melos Press, 2021)
- Elsewhere: Collected Poems of Nicholas Murray (The Melos Press, 2022)
- The Dictionary Speaks (The Melos Press, 2023)

Fiction

- A Short Book About Love (Seren, 2001)
- Remembering Carmen (Seren, 2003)

Non-fiction

- So Spirited A Town: Visions and Versions of Liverpool (Liverpool University Press, 2007)
- A Corkscrew Is Most Useful: The Travellers of Empire (Little, Brown, 2008)
- Real Bloomsbury (Seren, 2010)
- Crossings: A Journey through Borders (Seren, 2016)

Contributions to Anthologies

- The Poet’s View: poems for paintings in the Walker Art Gallery, Liverpool ed Gladys Mary Coles (1996)
- Other People’s Clerihews ed Gavin Ewart (Oxford University Press,1983)
- The Robin Hood Book: verse versus austerity eds Alan Morrison and Angela Topping (Caparison, 2012)
- Poets for Corbyn, Bennetts, Russell (Pendant Publishing, 2015)
- New Boots and Pantisocracies eds WN Herbert and Andy Jackson (Smokestack Books, 2016)
- Poems for Jeremy Corbyn ed Merryn Williams (Shoestring, 2016)
- Poems from the Borders ed Amy Wack (Seren, 2019)
- Ten Poems About Swimming ed Samantha Wynne-Rhydderch (Candlestick Press 2022)
