= The Dancer Upstairs (novel) =

Novel by Nicholas Shakespeare

- Author: Nicholas Shakespeare
- Language: English
- Genre: Novel
- Publisher: The Harvill Press
- Publication date: 1995
- Media type: Print

The Dancer Upstairs is a 1995 novel by Nicholas Shakespeare. It is based on the Maoist insurgency of the 1980s in Peru, and tells the story of Agustin Rejas, a police Lieutenant (later promoted to Captain), hunting a terrorist based on Abimael Guzmán, leader of the Shining Path. In 2002 it was given a film adaptation under the same title.
