= Cobra Verde =

1987 drama film directed by Werner Herzog

- Theatrical release poster
- Directed by: Werner Herzog
- Screenplay by: Werner Herzog
- Based on: The Viceroy of Ouidah by Bruce Chatwin
- Produced by: Lucki Stipetić; Walter Saxer
- Starring: Klaus Kinski; King Ampaw; José Lewgoy
- Cinematography: Viktor Růžička
- Edited by: Maximiliane Mainka
- Music by: Popol Vuh
- Distributed by: Werner Herzog Filmproduktion
- Release date: 3 December 1987
- Running time: 111 minutes
- Countries: West Germany; Ghana
- Language: German

Cobra Verde (also known as Slave Coast) is a 1987 drama film written and directed by Werner Herzog and starring Klaus Kinski in his fifth and final collaboration with Herzog. Based upon Bruce Chatwin's 1980 novel The Viceroy of Ouidah, the film depicts the life of a fictional slave trader who travels to the West African kingdom of Dahomey. It was filmed on location in Ghana, Brazil, and Colombia.

== Plot ==
In the late 19th century, Francisco Manoel da Silva (Klaus Kinski) is a debauched Brazilian rancher who has reluctantly gone to work at a gold mining company after his ranch is ruined by drought. When da Silva discovers that he is being financially exploited by the company, he murders his boss as punishment and goes on the lam to pursue a career as an outlaw and bandit, robbing stagecoaches passing through the desert. Thus, da Silva becomes the notorious Cobra Verde (Green Cobra), the most vicious bandit of the sertão region.

In a visit to town, da Silva encounters and subdues by force of character an escaping slave, an act that impresses wealthy sugar baron Dom Octávio Coutinho (José Lewgoy). Dom (Don) Coutinho, unaware that he is dealing with the legendary bandit, hires da Silva to oversee the slaves on his sugar plantation. When da Silva subsequently impregnates all three of the Dom's daughters, the sugar baron is furious, but the situation becomes even more complicated when he discovers that da Silva is none other than the infamous Cobra Verde. As punishment, rather than kill him or have him prosecuted, Dom Coutinho decides to send da Silva on the impossible mission of re-opening the slave trade with Western Africa. The bandit is aware he is likely to be killed in Africa, but accepts anyway.

Cobra Verde/da Silva travels by sea to Dahomey, West Africa (present-day Benin), where he must negotiate with the fearsome King Bossa Ahadee of Dahomey (played by His Honour the Omanhene Nana Agyefi Kwame II of Nsein, a village north of the city of Axim, Ghana). Amazingly, da Silva succeeds in convincing the King to exchange slaves for new rifles. He takes over Elmina Castle and takes Taparica (King Ampaw), sole survivor of the previous expedition, for a partner. They begin operating the slave trade across the Atlantic Ocean to Brazil. Soon, however, the fickle king has them captured and brought before him. The King accuses da Silva of various crimes that he has no knowledge of, including poisoning the King's greyhound, and sentences him to death. He and Taparica are rescued the night prior to da Silva's decapitation by the King's nephew, who negotiates a blood alliance with da Silva, planning to overthrow the King. The ambitious bandit trains an enormous army of native women (who, after learning to use weapons, at first want to kill all men) and leads them on a raid to successfully overthrow King Bossa.

Against all expectations, the slave trade is maintained under the new king, thanks to da Silva's resourcefulness. However, da Silva eventually falls out of favour with the new King, and discovers that in the meantime Brazil has outlawed slavery and seized his assets, and the British have placed a price on his head. Despite the adversity, da Silva is glad that finally a change has come and recognises that slavery has been a crime. The exhausted bandit goes onto the beach at Elmina and desperately tries to pull a ship's boat to water so he can escape. The boat is too heavy for one man's effort; after a strenuous fight to pull from the boat's rope da Silva collapses in the surf as the tide slowly comes in and an African man crippled by polio walks on all fours toward him along the shore.

The story ends with a group of confident young African women laughingly chanting over the end credits.

== Cast ==
- Klaus Kinski as Francisco Manoel da Silva
- King Ampaw as Taparica
- José Lewgoy as Don Octavio Coutinho
- Salvatore Basile as Captain Fraternidade
- Peter Berling as Bernabé
- Benito Stefanelli as Captain Pedro Vicente
- Carlos Mayolo as Governor of Bahia

== Production ==
Cobra Verde was based on Bruce Chatwin's 1980 novel The Viceroy of Ouidah, which was itself based on the Brazilian slave trader Francisco Félix de Sousa and his role in helping King Ghezo overthrow his brother Adandozan as King of Dahomey with the help of Ghezo's Dahomey Amazons. Herzog approached Chatwin about adapting his work into a film, and after learning that David Bowie had also expressed interest in adapting it as a feature, Herzog raced to acquire the rights and begin production.

The film was shot in Ghana, Brazil, and Colombia. During pre-production, Herzog showed Kinski photographs of the locations he was considering. Kinski disagreed with Herzog about which locations would be best for the film, and he took a trip with a group of friends to some remote places that fascinated him, including the foothills of the Sierra Nevada de Santa Marta and the Cape of the Sailing on the Guajira Peninsula in northern Colombia. Herzog ultimately decided to film in Villa de Leyva and Valle del Cauca. About the locations in the film, Kinski said: "Herzog does not know that I give life to the dead scenery."

== Tension between Herzog and Kinski ==
Cobra Verde was the last film Werner Herzog made with Klaus Kinski. Their now-legendary personality conflict peaked during the film. The film's production was especially affected by Kinski's fiery outbursts. At the time, Kinski was preparing his first film as a director, Paganini, and Herzog felt that his work on that project had caused Kinski to take on an "alien" air that negatively affected his performance in Cobra Verde. The cast and crew were continually plagued by Kinski's wrath, most famously culminating in the film's original cinematographer Thomas Mauch walking out on the project after a perpetual torrent of verbal abuse from Kinski. Herzog was forced to replace Mauch with Viktor Růžička.

Herzog's opinions of Kinski are deeply explored in his 1999 documentary retrospective, My Best Fiend, in which he examines their unique friendship, the associated hatred, and the legacy that both qualities were responsible for. The filming of Cobra Verde and the relationship of Herzog and Kinski was also the subject of a 1987 Swiss documentary film titled Location Africa.

== Reception ==
On the review aggregator website Rotten Tomatoes, 83% of 18 critics' reviews are positive, with an average rating of 6.9/10. Metacritic, which uses a weighted average, assigned the film a score of 55 out of 100, based on 5 critics, indicating "mixed or average" reviews.
