= The Viceroy of Ouidah =

1980 novel by Bruce Chatwin

- First US edition
- Author: Bruce Chatwin
- Language: English
- Publisher: Jonathan Cape
- Publication date: 1980
- Publication place: United Kingdom
- Media type: Print (Hardback & Paperback)
- Pages: 160
- ISBN: 0-224-01820-5
- OCLC: 7070983
- Dewey Decimal: 823/.914 19
- LC Class: PR6053.H395 V5

The Viceroy of Ouidah is a novel published in 1980 by British author Bruce Chatwin.

== Summary ==
Chatwin's novel portrays the life of a fictional slave trader named Francisco Manuel da Silva, who is loosely based on a historical Catholic Brazilian, Francisco Félix de Sousa. He became powerful in Ouidah, on the so-called Slave Coast of West Africa, now Benin, Togo, and parts of the Volta Region in Ghana.

Chatwin was caught up in the violence of a coup in Dahomey (now Benin), where Ouidah is located, when he was researching the book.

== Film adaptation ==
The novel was adapted for the 1987 film Cobra Verde, directed by Werner Herzog and starring Klaus Kinski as Francisco Manuel da Silva.

== Reception ==
The novel received mixed reviews. In The New York Times, John Thompson compared The Viceroy to other about-Africa prose works:

"One could mention Graham Greene's Journey Without Maps or, for a work of the imagination based on somewhat less horrendous events, Chinua Achebe's Arrow of God. That novel of West Africa has violence enough, and cruel superstition too, yet it is suffused with the common humanity of which I find not one dried drop in The Viceroy of Ouidah."

Years later, in a 1999 review of Nicholas Shakespeare's biography of Chatwin, The Guardian described the Viceroy novel as "a rococo piece of candyfloss."
