= Nicholas Shakespeare =

British novelist and biographer (born 1957)

Nicholas Shakespeare FRSL
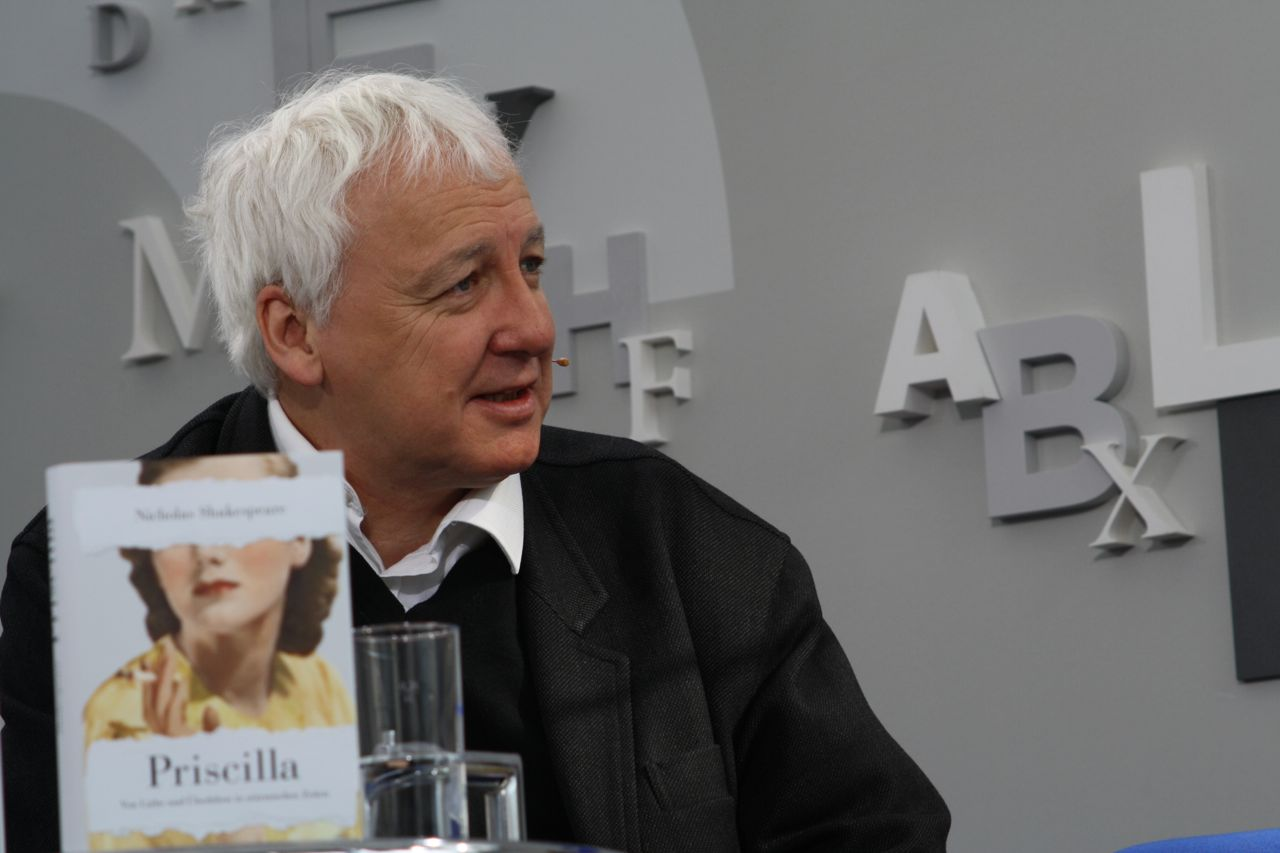
- Born: Nicholas William Richmond Shakespeare; 3 March 1957 (age 69); Worcester, Worcestershire, England
- Education: Magdalene College, Cambridge
- Relatives: Geoffrey Shakespeare (great-uncle)
- Writing career
- Language: English

Nicholas William Richmond Shakespeare FRSL (born 3 March 1957) is a British novelist, biographer, broadcaster, and journalist. He was described by the Wall Street Journal as "one of the best English novelists of our time". He has written biographies of Bruce Chatwin, Ian Fleming, and his aunt in Priscilla: The Hidden Life of an Englishwoman in Wartime France. Shakespeare is also known for his charity work.

== Biography ==
Born in Worcester, England to diplomat John William Richmond Shakespeare and his wife Lalage Ann, daughter of the travel writer and journalist S. P. B. Mais, Shakespeare grew up in Asia and South America, including Brazil, where his father worked at the British Embassy between 1966 and 1969. Shakespeare's great-great-great uncle is Anthony Fenn Kemp. John Shakespeare was later chargé d'affaires at Buenos Aires, before serving as Ambassador to Peru from 1983 to 1987, and Ambassador to Morocco from 1987 to 1990. Nicholas was educated at the Dragon School preparatory school in Oxford, then at Winchester College and at Magdalene College, Cambridge. He worked as a journalist for BBC television and then on The Times as assistant arts and literary editor. From 1988 to 1991, he was literary editor of The Daily Telegraph and The Sunday Telegraph.

Shakespeare's time in South America is represented in two novels, The Vision of Elena Silves (1989, Somerset Maugham Award, Betty Trask Award) and The Dancer Upstairs (1995, American Library Association Award for The Best Novel of the Year). Other works from this period are The Men Who Would Be King (1984), Londoners (1986) and The High Flyer (1993, long-listed for the Booker Prize).

In 1999, Shakespeare published his biography of Bruce Chatwin to widespread critical acclaim. This was followed by the novel Snowleg (2004, long-listed for the Booker Prize, Dublin IMPAC Award) a "place" book, In Tasmania (2004, winner of the Tasmania Book Prize 2007), Secrets of the Sea (2007, short-listed for the Commonwealth Writer's prize) and Inheritance (2010, long-listed for Dublin IMPAC Award). In 2010, he published Under the Sun, the letters of Bruce Chatwin, which he co-edited with Elizabeth Chatwin.

Nicholas Shakespeare has made several extended biographies for television: on Evelyn Waugh, Mario Vargas Llosa, Bruce Chatwin, Martha Gellhorn, and Dirk Bogarde. The Dancer Upstairs was made into a feature film of the same name in 2002, for which Shakespeare wrote the screenplay and which John Malkovich directed. Shakespeare was nominated as one of Granta's Best of British Young Novelists in 1993. He has written articles for Granta, the London Review of Books, The Times Literary Supplement and The Monthly, among other publications.

Shakespeare's novels, which have been translated into 22 languages, place ordinary people against a background of significant events, as with The Dancer Upstairs, which deals with Abimael Guzmán, leader of Peru's Shining Path; and Snowleg, set partly during the Cold War in East Germany.

In 1999, Shakespeare was made a Fellow of the Royal Society of Literature.

In 2010, Shakespeare was invited by the Anglo-Argentine Society to give the prestigious Borges Lecture in London.

In January 2012, according to journalists, Nicholas Shakespeare's writings were mistakenly confused for William Shakespeare's by French presidential candidate François Hollande when he said: "Let me quote Shakespeare, 'they failed because they did not start with a dream'" (Je me permets de citer Shakespeare, ils ont échoué parce qu'ils n'ont pas commencé par le rêve.)

In 2013, Shakespeare published an account of his aunt, Priscilla: The Hidden Life of an Englishwoman in Wartime France.

In 2015, Shakespeare published a collection of stories, Stories from Other Places. The central novella, "Oddfellows", was based on the Battle of Broken Hill, a little-known jihadi attack in the Australian outback 100 years ago. On 1 January 1915, two Afghan camel drivers answered the Turkish sultan's call for a holy war against the British Empire, and attacked a picnic train of 1200 men women and children in the iron-ore town of Broken Hill, killing four. The incident was the only known act of hostility on Australian soil in World War One. The Sunday Telegraph described them as "honed miniatures" and the Australian critic Peter Craven in the Sydney Morning Herald wrote: "I do not expect to read a more formidable piece of short fiction this year."

In 2016, Shakespeare was a visiting fellow at All Souls College, Oxford, where he wrote the historical narrative "Six Minutes in May: How Churchill Unexpectedly Became Prime Minister" (2017), about the disastrous Norway Campaign of April 1940, which led to Churchill's unanticipated accession on Friday 10 May. Shakespeare's account was nominated as a Book of the Year in The Economist, The Guardian, The Observer, The Scotsman, The Daily Telegraph (as No. 2 of "the Best 50 Books of 2017"), and The Australian, where Peter Craven wrote: "Shakespeare has written a book that will captivate readers and fill professional historians with envy at how far he outclasses them."

In 2024, Shakespeare published Ian Fleming: The Complete Man, a biography of James Bond creator Ian Fleming. The project was authorised by Fleming's estate. The Wall Street Journal's Anna Mundow called the book "arresting", The Economist called it "definitive", The Australian "a masterpiece... His book is better than almost any non-fiction ever gets, a work of literature in its own right", while Washington Post columnist Michael Dirda also praised Shakespeare's work as 'a dazzling, even dizzying achievement'. CrimeReads named the work one of its "best reviewed" books in April 2024.

Shakespeare promoted the Fleming biography at literature festivals and other global events, including a collaboration with the International Spy Museum in Washington, D.C. Shakespeare claimed he took on the project after "discovering that [Fleming's] war work was indeed significant, as well as how much kinder he was in life than his posthumous caricature suggested." The Fleming biography also recounts the original casting of Sean Connery in the role of Bond during the 1960s. It won the 2024 CWA Gold Dagger for Non-Fiction.

=== Charity work ===
Shakespeare has worked with charities such as Oxfam, for which he has written several times, and the Anita Goulden Trust, of which he has been the patron since 2000; the charity, which helps children in the Peruvian city of Piura, was set up following an article that Shakespeare wrote for the Daily Telegraph magazine, which raised more than £350,000.

In 2009, Shakespeare donated the short story "The Death of Marat" to Oxfam's Ox-Tales project, four collections of UK stories written by 38 authors. Shakespeare's contribution was published in the Earth collection. He also contributed a story, "The Return of the Native", to OxTravels, a travel anthology that was produced to raise money for Oxfam's work.

In October 2012, Shakespeare travelled to Cambodia with photographer Emma Hardy to visit Oxfam's work. He wrote two articles about the trip, "Beyond The Killing Fields", which was published in Intelligent Life, and "How The Dead Live", which was published in New Statesman.

== Works ==
- The Men Who Would Be King: A Look at Royalty in Exile (Sidgwick & Jackson, 1984)
- Londoners (Sidgwick & Jackson, 1986)
- The Vision of Elena Silves (Harvill, 1989)
- The High Flyer (Harvill, 1993)
- The Dancer Upstairs (Harvill, 1995)
- Bruce Chatwin (Harvill, 1999)
- Snowleg (Harvill, 2004)
- In Tasmania: Adventures at the End of the World (Harvill, 2004)
- Secrets of the Sea (Harvill, 2007)
- Inheritance (Harvill, 2010)
- Under the Sun: The Letters of Bruce Chatwin, selector and editor with Elizabeth Chatwin (Cape, 2010)
- Priscilla: The Hidden Life of an Englishwoman in Wartime France (HarperCollins, 2014)
- Oddfellows on the Battle of Broken Hill (Random House, 2015)
- Stories from Other Places (Harvill Secker, 2016)
- Six Minutes in May. How Churchill Unexpectedly Became Prime Minister (Harvill Secker, 2017)
- The Sandpit (Harvill Secker, 2020)
- Ian Fleming: The Complete Man (Harvill Secker, 2023)
