= The Magic Toyshop (film) =

Television film

- Genre: Drama; Fantasy; Horror
- Teleplay by: Angela Carter
- Story by: Angela Carter
- Directed by: David Wheatley
- Starring: Caroline Milmoe; Tom Bell; Kilian McKenna; Patricia Kerrigan
- Music by: Bill Connor
- Country of origin: United Kingdom
- Original language: English

Production
- Executive producer: Steve Morrison
- Producer
- Cinematography: Ken Morgan
- Editor: Anthony Ham
- Running time: 107 minutes

Original release
- Network: ITV
- Release: November 5, 1988

The Magic Toyshop is a 1987 British film, adapted by Angela Carter from her 1967 novel of the same name. It was produced by Granada Television (now ITV Productions) and premiered in British cinemas on 31 July 1987, subsequently appearing on ITV on 5 November 1988. It was directed by David Wheatley.

== Plot ==
Melanie (played by Caroline Milmoe) is aged fifteen and loses her parents after they are killed in a plane crash over the Grand Canyon. As a result, Melanie and her younger brother and sister are sent to London to live with their Uncle Philip (played by Tom Bell) in London. Uncle Phillip lives with his mute wife Margaret, who is scared of her husband and only communicates through notes. Uncle Philip is a toymaker including of puppets, who secretly has the power to make his toys come to life, and he maintains control over his family. He forces his family to attend the plays he performs in the back of his shop.

== Cast ==
- Caroline Milmoe as Melanie
- Tom Bell as Uncle Philip
- Patricia Kerrigan as Aunt Margaret
- Kilian McKenna as Finn, Margaret's brother
- Lorcan Cranitch as Francie, Margaret's brother
- Gareth Bushill as Jonathan, Melanie's brother
- Georgina Hulme as Victoria, Melanie's sister
- Marlene Sidaway as Mrs. Rundle
- Marguerite Porter as Coppelia
- Lloyd Newson as Artist
- Jeremy Kerridge as Chinaman/dancer
- Jayne Regan as Blank puppet/dancer
- Marina Stevenson as Cleopatra

== Production ==
Carter wrote the script for the film and during the production stage, Wheatley and Carter watched films together that initially inspired her to write the book including Valerie and Her Week of Wonders and Goto: Island of Love.

The Magic Toyshop was originally filmed on 16mm film for television.

== Broadcast and commercial releases ==
According to a press release by Granada Television, they converted the negative to 35mm for a feature film and it was the first Granada production to be shown in commercial cinemas in the United Kingdom. It premiered during the London Film Festival in 1986 and commercial cinema in July 1987.

The film toured International Film Festivals and won The Grand Prix du Jury for Best Foreign Film in the Features Section at the Belfort Film Festival.

== Reception ==
The Magic Toyshop received positive reviews as an adaption of the book, and Joanne Hill writes "the film successfully avoids an overly voyeuristic portrayal of Melanie's sexual explorations." Shelia Benson reviewed the film for the LA Times in 1988 and said it is " a gorgeous, strange and mesmerising fairytale for adults” and goes on to write that it "gets its power from the clarity with which novelist-screenwriter Angela Carter re-creates that tantalising state between girlhood and adolescence.” However, a 2012 Time Out review is more negative and compares it to the film The Company of Wolves, another adaption of an Angela Carter story, writing "in sad contrast to The Company of Wolves, the nastiness is tame, the pace too laid-back, the sex not laid-back enough, and a magical atmosphere singularly lacking.”

== Sources ==
- https://www.theguardian.com/books/2016/oct/01/angela-carter-far-from-fairytale-edmund-gordon
- Gamble, S. and Watz, A. (2025) Angela Carter's futures: Representations, adaptations and legacies. London: Bloomsbury Publishing Plc. ISBN 9781350343573
