= Wise Children =

1991 novel by Angela Carter

- First edition
- Author: Angela Carter
- Language: English
- Genre: Magical realism, theatre-fiction
- Publisher: Chatto & Windus
- Publication date: 1991
- Publication place: United Kingdom
- Media type: Print (hardback and paperback)
- Pages: 232 pp
- ISBN: 0-09-998110-6
- OCLC: 26311519

Wise Children (1991) was the last novel written by Angela Carter. The novel follows the fortunes of twin chorus girls, Dora and Nora Chance, and their bizarre theatrical family. It explores the subversive nature of fatherhood, the denying of which leads Nora and Dora to frivolous "illegitimate" lechery. The novel plays on Carter's admiration of Shakespeare and her love of fairy tales and the surreal, incorporating a large amount of magical realism and elements of the carnivalesque that probes and twists our expectations of reality and society.

== Background ==
Angela Carter wrote this novel after she knew she had been diagnosed with lung cancer. She was married with a small son.

== Plot summary ==
The story begins on the 75th birthday of identical twin sisters, Dora and Nora Chance. By what Dora, who is also the narrator of the story, describes as a bizarre coincidence, it is also the 100th birthday of their natural father, Melchior Hazard, and his fraternal twin brother, Peregrine Hazard, who is believed to be dead. The date is also Shakespeare's supposed birthday – 23 April.

Dora and Nora's birthday gets off to a dramatic start when their half-brother, Tristram Hazard, who believes himself to be the nephew of the twins, arrives on their doorstep. He announces that Tiffany – his partner, and the goddaughter of the twins – is missing. Dora and Nora soon discover that Tiffany is pregnant with Tristram's baby, but he is unwilling to take on the responsibility. Once this bombshell has been dropped, it emerges that a body has been found and it is believed to be Tiffany's.

Most of the novel consists of Dora's memories. As well as providing the backstory of her natural father, Melchior Hazard, her legal father, Peregrine Hazard, and her guardian, Grandma Chance, Dora describes key events of her life. As Melchior becomes a renowned Shakespearean theatre actor in the 1920s, he refuses to acknowledge his daughters, who are publicly and legally believed to be the daughters of Peregrine instead. Dora is deeply hurt by Melchior's rejection, contrasting the loving nature of Peregrine, who becomes the twins' father figure. She recalls her early theatre performances and her first sexual experience, in which she impersonates Nora and sleeps with her unknowing lover. Melchior marries Lady Atalanta Lynde, who Dora calls "Lady A", and has two legitimate twin daughters, Saskia and Imogen. In the 1930s, he goes to Hollywood and produces a film version of A Midsummer Night's Dream in which Dora and Nora play Peaseblossom and Mustardseed. The production ends in disaster as Melchior leaves his first wife to elope with the wife of the film's producer, who plays the Titania to his Oberon in the film.

After the Second World War, during which Grandma Chance is killed in the Blitz, Dora and Nora attend the 21st birthday party of Saskia and Imogen. Melchior announces, to Saskia and Imogen's fury, a third marriage to the best friend of Saskia, who is playing Cordelia in his King Lear. The announcement sparks a family argument in which Peregrine disappears, never to be seen again. The same night, Lady A falls down a flight of stairs and uses a wheelchair for the rest of her life; she moves in with Dora and Nora. It is implied Saskia and Imogen may have pushed her down the stairs in their rage. Melchior has two more twins, Tristram and Gareth. Saskia, in an act of vengeance, enters into an incestuous sexual relationship with her half-brother Tristram. Gareth, meanwhile, becomes a priest and vanishes.

Dora, Nora and Lady A attend Melchior's 100th birthday party, where most of the novel's expansive cast of characters are in attendance. Melchior acknowledges Dora and Nora are his children for the first time in their lives. Peregrine makes a dramatic entrance accompanied by Tiffany, revealing both are still alive, and Lady A reveals that Peregrine is the true father of Saskia and Imogen. While Melchior and Nora share a dance together, Dora has sex with her paternal uncle Peregrine upstairs. She asks Peregrine if he is her father too; Peregrine strongly denies it, but suggests Grandma Chance may have been Dora and Nora's true mother.

The novel ends with Dora and Nora being presented with the twin babies of the missing son Gareth to look after – a gift from Peregrine. They realise that they "can't afford" to die until they've seen their children grow up. The final line of the story is a message constantly conveyed throughout the novel: "What a joy it is to dance and sing!"

== Main characters ==
- Dora Chance – 75 years of age, minor theatre and film star, illegitimate daughter of Melchior Hazard and "Pretty Kitty". Believed by outsiders to be the daughter of Peregrine Hazard.
- Nora Chance – Twin sister and best friend of Dora.
- Melchior Hazard – High-profile theatre and film star, known for putting career before his family. Biological Father of Nora and Dora.
- Peregrine Hazard – Twin brother of Melchior, who raises Nora and Dora. Adventurer, explorer, actor. Embodies magic realism and the carnivalesque.
- Lady Atalanta Hazard (Wheelchair) – First wife of Melchior Hazard, mother of Saskia and Imogen. In her later life, she is cared for by Nora and Dora after her daughters push her down a staircase and take all her money
- Delia Delaney (Daisy Duck) – Actress, second wife of Genghis Khan, former lover of Peregrine Hazard, second wife, briefly, of Melchior Hazard. Later marries Puck from the production of 'Midsummer Night's Dream.'
- My Lady Margarine – Third wife of Melchior Hazard. Mother to Gareth and Tristram. Known as "Lady Margarine" because she stars in a margarine advert on TV.
- Grandma Chance – Guardian of Dora and Nora Chance. Peregrine suggests that Grandma Chance may have been Dora and Nora's mother, but Dora considers this unlikely. Nudist and vegetarian. She is also against picking flowers, believing it to be cruel.
- Saskia Hazard – Legal daughter of Melchior Hazard. TV chef. Cunning and ambitious. Has an ongoing relationship with Tristram, her half brother. Nemesis of Dora Chance. Assumed by Nora and Dora to be the biological daughter of Peregrine Hazard.
- Imogen Hazard – Legal daughter of Melchior Hazard, twin sister of Saskia Hazard. Plays a fish on a children's TV program.
- Tristram Hazard – Son of Melchior Hazard's third marriage. Presenter of "Lashings of Lolly." Twin brother of Gareth.
- Tiffany – Goddaughter of Dora and Nora Chance. Girlfriend of Tristram Hazard, with whom she hosts "Lashings of Lolly", a TV gameshow. Also pregnant with Tristram's baby.

== Other characters ==
- Gareth Hazard – Son of Melchior Hazard's third marriage. Twin brother of Tristram Hazard. He became a missionary in his teens and was later based in South America. His children are presented to Dora and Nora at the end of the novel.
- Estella 'A Star Danced' Hazard – Mother of Melchior and Peregrine. A Shakespearian actress. Her nickname is a reference to a line in William Shakespeare's Much Ado About Nothing said by Beatrice: "Then there was a star danced and under that was I born."
- Ranulph Hazard – Husband of Estella Hazard. Ranulph kills Estella, Cassius Booth and himself.
- Cassius Booth – Boyfriend of Estella Hazard. Possibly the father of Melchior and Peregrine.
- Pretty Kitty – Mother of Dora and Nora Chance, she dies giving birth to the girls.
- ‘Our Cyn’ – Mother of Mavis, grandmother of Brenda and great grandmother of Tiffany. Showed up at Grandma Chance's door as a peasant.
- Miss Worthington – Dora and Nora's dance teacher.
- Mrs. Worthington – Miss Worthington's mother.
- Gorgeous George – Comedian who appears as Bottom in a film version of A Midsummer Night's Dream. A Patriot who displays a map of the British Empire on his body. He is reduced to begging at the end of the novel.
- ‘Pantomime Goose’ – Nora Chance's first boyfriend.
- Principal boy – The wife of the Pantomime Goose.
- ‘Blond tenor with unmemorable name’ – Nora Chance's boyfriend, to whom Dora loses her virginity on her seventeenth birthday.
- Genghis Khan – A film producer. He produces a film version of 'The Dream' later described as a "masterpiece of kitsch". Takes his name from the ruthless Mongol warlord Genghis Khan because he behaves in manner that is perceived as similar. At one point is engaged to Dora Chance, but the marriage does not occur. Marries Daisy Duck.
- Genghis Khan's first wife – A jealous woman who still loves her ex-husband after his marriage to Daisy Duck.
- Mascara – Dance teacher during the filming of The Dream.
- ‘Radical German exile’ – Boyfriend of Dora Chance.
- Puck – Third husband of Delia Delaney.
- Ross "Irish" O'Flaherty – An American writer and a boyfriend of Dora Chance, who taught her about literature.
- Tony – Nora's boyfriend and fiancé on the set of The Dream.
- Brenda – The granddaughter of 'Our Cyn' and the mother of Tiffany.
- Leroy Jenkins – The husband of Brenda.
- Miss. Euphemia Hazard – Melchior and Peregrine's Presbyterian aunt, who adopts Melchior after his parents' deaths.

== Family tree ==
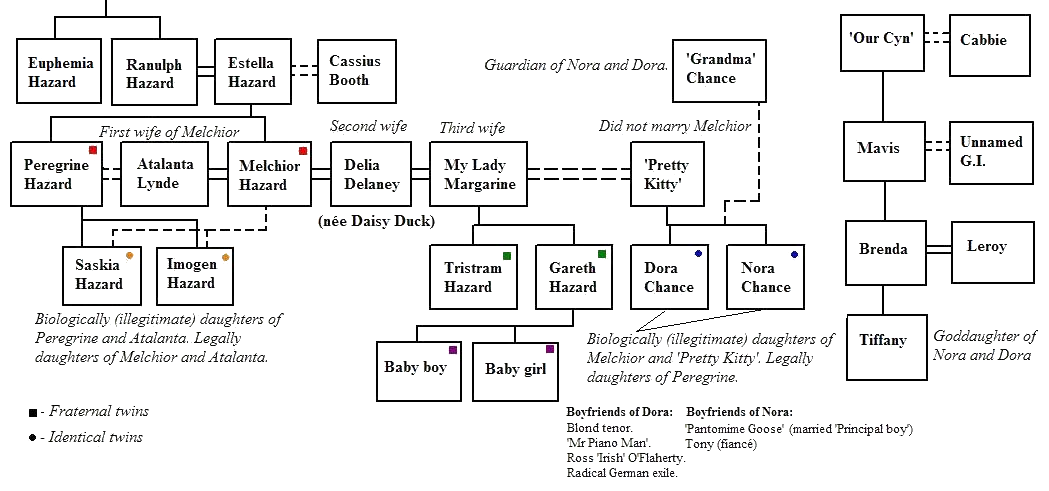
Solid lines indicate biological relationships. Dotted lines indicate others (not recognised by law, for example).

== Major symbols ==
There are many symbols used in the book which illustrate the themes. Carter frequently uses objects and places which take on meanings beyond the literal and begin to develop ideas about society, for example:

A grandfather clock represents their absent father, as it was given to them by their great Aunt (Ranulph's Sister) and sent to their house as the last known address of Melchior. It is also a phallic symbol. It is flawed, as it doesn't always strike the right time: "it gives out the time in a falsetto ping, and always the wrong time". This links to their father, as he is also flawed, there being aspects of his personality which are less than admirable.

Song and dance represents their career.

London is their home city and their birthplace. There is a carnivalesque element to London as a city that is constantly changing.

The pairing of opposites is shown in sets of twins and in the family names "Chance" and "Hazard" (two words with the same meaning, perhaps emphasising the superficial nature of the differences between them).

== Themes ==
Illegitimacy versus legitimacy: Nora and Dora are from "the wrong side of the tracks" and were "born out of wedlock", their father is "a pillar of the legit theatre" and throughout the book the twins are constantly trying to become legitimate and be accepted. However, Carter questions the concept of legitimacy, and whether it is just a perception rather than reality: even the characters that are seen to be from the legitimate side do not always act in a respectable way, for example Saskia has an affair with Tristram, her half-brother. See Illegitimacy in fiction.

Carnivalesque: Carter uses the carnivalesque to illustrate some of her points about social boundaries, such as illegitimacy and highbrow/lowbrow. Important instances include the scene at the burning mansion in Chapter 2, where she describes the "orgiastic" element to the scene, using images of the "flickering flames" to emphasise this: the highbrow party and mansion is reduced to a ruined, passionate near-orgy by the fire and the breaking of social boundaries. This is similar to the final chapter when Dora and Perry have sex, as Nora says she wishes Dora would "fuck the house down": as well as physically damaging the Hazard residence, Dora and Perry having sex almost brings down the divide between the highbrow and lowbrow sides of the family. Some of the imagery used in this scene echoes the imagery of the Chapter 2 scene, for example "cover them all... with plaster dust and come and fire".

Incest: for example Saskia and Tristram are half brother and sister (although may be cousins), Nora loses her virginity to a pantomime goose when playing a gosling, Perry sleeps with Dora. Melchior and Peregrine also share partners (e.g. Daisy Duck, Lady A); Nora and Dora both sleep with the Blond Tenor. This could be seen as carnivalesque, as it inverts social hierarchies and boundaries. There is also the recurring idea of the actress playing Cordelia falling for the actor playing Lear in Shakespeare's "King Lear" on stage.

Culture and class: the high culture of the theatre in the legitimate side of the family as opposed to the dance halls in which Nora and Dora perform.

Shakespeare: Shakespeare is used continually, the ideas of his plays are incorporates, comparisons made continually between characters of the book and of the play and the book itself is written in five chapters just as a Shakespearian play often had five acts. Melchior idolises his father, and also Shakespeare, worshipping earth from ground that Shakespeare once performed on more than his own daughters. The inclusion of Shakespeare references in Dora's narrative highlights the idea of culture and class and of Shakespeare now being considered "high art".

== Allusions and references to other works ==
The term "wise children" occurs in two other works by Angela Carter: The Bloody Chamber and Nights at the Circus.

Throughout the novel, there are numerous references to the works and impact of William Shakespeare. At the beginning of the novel there are three quotations, two of which allude to Shakespeare: "Brush Up on Your Shakespeare", a song title from the musical Kiss Me, Kate based on Shakespeare's The Taming of the Shrew, and the quote "How many times Shakespeare draws fathers and daughters, never mothers and daughters" by Ellen Terry, an English stage actress. In an interview on the subject of Wise Children, Angela Carter stated "[I wanted] to have a transparent prose that just ran, I wanted it to be very funny, and at the same time I wanted the complex ideas about paternity and the idea of Shakespeare as a cultural ideology."

There are also various other theatrical quotations, for example there is a "paper moon" motif, symbolising the spot-light, and indicating a sense of illusion. Also present are instances of magic realism, which is when a scene is exaggerated to an extent when the reader cannot possibly believe it, but does because of the realism of the rest of the novel. This is known as the willing suspension of disbelief.

== Stage adaptation ==
A stage adaption based on the book, adapted and directed by Emma Rice premiered at The Old Vic in London on 8 October 2018. It was the debut production of a new theatre company, also named Wise Children, created and led by Rice.
