= Milmoe =

Milmoe is a surname. Notable people with the surname include:

- Caroline Milmoe (born 1963), English stage, film, and television actress
- Wheeler Milmoe (1898–1972), American newspaper editor and politician
- James Oliver Milmoe Sr (1927–2022), American commercial & fine art photographer, and photography educator
