= The Bloody Chamber (short story) =

1979 short story by Angela Carter

"The Bloody Chamber" is a historical short story published in 1979. It was written by English author Angela Carter. The tale is a retelling of the story of Bluebeard, and includes themes relating to the objectification of women, flawed power dynamics, and sexuality. This eponymous short story was originally published in a collection titled The Bloody Chamber, which deconstructed common fairy tales for a more modern and adult audience, resulting in both criticism and critical acclaim.

== Synopsis ==
The story is told from the perspective of an unnamed, poor young woman, who has recently married a rich man. She is enthralled by his wealth and attention, as well as the rush of a first romance. He then goes on a business trip, warning her not to open a certain door in his house. She is too overtaken by curiosity and eventually opens the forbidden door, revealing the dead bodies of her husband's previous wives. Fearful, the protagonist plans to flee, supported by the kindhearted blind boy whom her husband hired to tune her piano. However, she is stopped by the return of her husband from his trip, and his swift discovery that she entered the chamber as he knew she would. Just as he is about to murder her, her mother arrives at the mansion. Her mother shoots and kills him, vanquishing the threat. The story ends happily, with the main character inheriting her late husband’s wealth, opening a music school, and living happily with the piano tuner and her mother.

== Critical response ==
As mentioned above, The Bloody Chamber was met with mixed critical response upon publishing. Some praised the short story for a bold, innovative approach to such literature, while others felt it too vulgar. Others, however, found it reprehensible, taking the view that children's stories were being misappropriated for a twisted purpose.
