= David Wheatley =

David Wheatley may refer to:

- David Wheatley (director) (1949–2009), British film and television director
- David Wheatley (poet) (born 1970), Irish poet and academic
