= Hot Metal =

British TV sitcom (1986–1988)

- Genre: Comedy
- Written by: Andrew Marshall; David Renwick
- Directed by: David Askey; Nic Phillips
- Starring: Robert Hardy; Richard Kane; Geoffrey Palmer; Richard Wilson; Caroline Milmoe
- Theme music composer: Alan Price
- Opening theme: "Papers"
- Composers: Nigel Hess (Series 1); David Firman (Series 2)
- Country of origin: United Kingdom
- Original language: English
- No. of series: 2 + Charity special
- No. of episodes: 12 (list of episodes)

Production
- Producer: Humphrey Barclay
- Production companies: Humphrey Barclay Productions; London Weekend Television

Original release
- Network: ITV
- Release: 16 February 1986 – 10 March 1989

Hot Metal is a British sitcom produced by London Weekend Television about the newspaper industry, that aired for two series on the ITV network in 1986 and 1988, along with a special episode for Comic Relief in 1989, that was broadcast on BBC One. Written by Andrew Marshall and David Renwick, it is very much a continuation in style from their previous sitcom Whoops Apocalypse!. It was produced by Humphrey Barclay Productions for LWT. After its original transmission, the series was repeated in 1988 on Channel 4 and in 2022 on Forces TV.

== Synopsis ==
The Daily Crucible, the dullest newspaper in Fleet Street, is abruptly taken over by media magnate Terence "Twiggy" Rathbone (Robert Hardy) (a parody of real-life media magnates, especially Rupert Murdoch and Robert Maxwell). Its editor Harry Stringer (Geoffrey Palmer) is 'promoted' to managing editor, and is replaced in his old job by Russell Spam (also played by Hardy). Stringer is convinced that Spam is in fact Rathbone in disguise, until he sees the two of them together (via split-screen). In a later episode Stringer meets the paper's board of directors, all of whom are also played by Hardy.

Spam turns the Crucible into a sensation-seeking scandal rag, very much in the style of the British tabloids of the 1980s, in particular The Sun and The Daily Mirror. In one episode, the Crucible's Page 3 is spiced up by the invention of "Wobblevision", a method of animating nude glamour photos by means of special printing techniques and 3D-style glasses with moving filters. This idea has to be dropped due to medical evidence that it causes migraines and vision problems; following this revelation Stringer tells a user, "stop it, you'll go blind".

Spam is helped in his popularising campaign by his ace gutter journalist Greg Kettle (Richard Kane), who intimidates his tabloid victims by claiming to be "a representative of Her Majesty's press" and produces stories such as accusing a vicar of being a werewolf. Throughout the first series, a running plot involved cub reporter Bill Tytla (John Gordon Sinclair) gradually uncovering an actual newsworthy story that went to the very heart of government (Tytla appears to be named after animator Vladimir "Bill" Tytla).

In the second series, Harry Stringer had vanished in a "mysterious aircraft accident", to be replaced as Managing Editor by former daytime chat show host Richard Lipton (Richard Wilson). The cub reporter investigating the running plot this time was Maggie Troon (Caroline Milmoe).

The show's opening title sequence depicts the titles apparently being printed by metal type blocks; in the closing titles, blocks spelling the main title are seen melting in time-lapse behind the credits.

== Cast ==
- Robert Hardy as Russell Spam, Terrence "Twiggy" Rathbone and Daily Crucible board members
- Richard Kane as Greg Kettle
- Geoffrey Palmer as Harold Stringer (series 1)
- John Gordon Sinclair as Bill Tytla (series 1)
- Geoffrey Hutchings as Max Rutherford (series 1)
- John Horsley as Father Teasdale (series 1)
- Sarah Mortimer as Sharon Chandler (series 1)
- Richard Wilson as Richard "Dicky" Lipton (series 2)
- Caroline Milmoe as Maggie Troon (series 2)
- David Barrass as Jack Thrush (series 2)

== Episode list ==
In total, twelve episodes were made and broadcast. A Comic Relief special episode was also broadcast.

=== Series 1 ===
No.	Title	Original release date
1	"The Tell-Tale Heart"	16 February 1986
2	"The Modern Prometheus"	23 February 1986
3	"Beyond The Infinite"	2 March 1986
4	"Casting The Runes"	9 March 1986
5	"The Slaughter of the Innocent"	16 March 1986
6	"The Respectable Prostitute"	23 March 1986

=== Series 2 ===
No.	Title	Original release date
7	"Religion of the People"	6 March 1988
8	"The Joker to the Thief"	13 March 1988
9	"The Hydra's Head"	20 March 1988
10	"The Twilight Zone"	27 March 1988
11	"Crown of Thorns"	10 April 1988
12	"Unleash the Kraken"	17 April 1988

=== Comic Relief special ===
In 1989 the show was briefly revived for a 13-minute Comic Relief special "The Satellite Years" (AKA "The Rat Sat on the Cat"), with Hardy and Palmer reviving their roles from the first series (though the second series set was used).

No.	Title	Original release date
13	"The Satellite Years" "The Rat Sat on the Cat"	10 March 1989

== DVD and streaming release ==
Both series of Hot Metal have been released on DVD. A 2-disc set of the complete series has also been released. In March 2022 the series was added to UK streaming service BritBox.

DVD	Release date
The Complete Series 1	7 September 2009
The Complete Series 2	19 April 2010
The Complete Series 1 to 2 Box Set	18 October 2010
