= Shadow dance =

Shadow dance may refer to:

- Shadow dancing, a variation of the country/western two-step
- "Shadow Dance", an episode of the animated series X-Men: Evolution
- Shadow Dance (novel), a novel by Angela Carter
- "Shadow Dance", a song by Dave Holland from Jumpin' In, 1984
- "Shadow Dance", a song by Mercy Creek from The Name of the Record is Mercy Creek, 1999
