= The Sadeian Woman and the Ideology of Pornography =

1978 non-fiction book by Angela Carter

The Sadeian Woman and the Ideology of Pornography (U.S.A.) The Sadeian Woman: An Exercise in Cultural History (UK)
- Cover of the first American edition
- Author: Angela Carter
- Language: English
- Subject: Marquis de Sade
- Publisher: Pantheon Books (U.S.A.); Virago Press (UK)
- Publication date: 1978 (U.S.A.); 1979 (UK)
- Publication place: United Kingdom
- Media type: Print
- Pages: 154 pp.
- ISBN: 0-394-50575-1
- OCLC: 4495463
- Dewey Decimal: 843.6
- LC Class: PQ2063.S3

The Sadeian Woman and the Ideology of Pornography is the American title of a 1978 non-fiction book by Angela Carter, an English writer who primarily wrote fiction. British publication was delayed until 1979, when the book appeared as The Sadeian Woman: An Exercise in Cultural History.

== Background ==
Carter discovered the work of the Marquis de Sade while living in Japan in the early 1970s. She was inspired by "the Japanese experience of reading pornographic comic books alongside the works of de Sade" and wrote The Sadeian Woman in the years after she moved back to England. The Virago Press commissioned Carter to write the book in 1977.

The Marquis de Sade, a French writer from the late 18th century, is well known for his controversial pornography, specifically his violent pornographic novels. He was a libertine of the French Revolution and was imprisoned by Napoleon in 1801 for being the author of the novels Juliette and Justine. He is widely considered to be unethical and a corrupter of women.

In Britain, prior to the time in which The Sadeian Woman was written, it was widely accepted that women were mostly passive participants in physical sexual activity and were not aroused when they were initiators (or expected to be initiators) of sexual activity. During the 1960s and 1970s, sexual norms and gender roles were transforming, along with the social and material conditions that shaped female sexuality. Carter was writing her book in a time when it was possible to look back at a period of change over many years, where "women increasingly expected to be sexually active outside their roles as mothers and wives, when courting, and to start asking what this meant for women."

== Summary ==
The book is a feminist re-appraisal of the work of the Marquis de Sade, consisting of a collection of essays analyzing his literature. Carter argues that "Sade remains a monstrous and daunting cultural edifice; yet [she] would like to think that he put pornography in the service of women, or, perhaps, allowed it to be invaded by an ideology not inimical to women." Carter's critical analysis of the Marquis de Sade's fiction focuses on, among other topics, what can be revealed by the distribution of sexual, social, and economic power between the sexes in late eighteenth-century Europe and how this is different from and similar to the distribution of power between the sexes at the time Carter was writing her book.

Carter argues that Marquis de Sade was a "moral pornographer," one that analyzed the relation between the sexes within his work. She argues that Marquis "would not be the enemy of women," as she views his works as contradicting patriarchal notions of sex and femininity.

== Reception ==
The Sadeian Woman received a variety of reviews. Some critics disagreed with her argument that de Sade was a "moral pornographer." In an interview in 1988, Carter reflects that "moral pornographer was a phrase that got [her] into a lot of trouble with the sisters, some of the sisters."

John Bayley of The New York Review of Books praised Carter for her book and her influence in general. He found that Carter excels at both "dressing up pop art in academic gear and presenting crude aspects of modern living in a satirically elegant style." He agrees with Carter that de Sade's pornography revealed the problems imposed on women due to "man-made stereotypes... for centuries before and since."

Her work was criticized by the radical feminist and anti-porn theorist Andrea Dworkin in her 1981 book Pornography: Men Possessing Women. Unlike Dworkin, Carter sees de Sade as being the first writer to see women as more than mere breeding machines, as more than just their biology and, as such, finds him liberating.

== Influence ==
The Marquis de Sade’s pornography went on to influence Carter's fictional work. In The Bloody Chamber, a collection of short stories published the following year, the opening story follows a young, unnamed French woman who is groomed into sex and, subsequently, marriage by the scopophiliac Marquis.

The Sadeian Woman, among Carter's other works, had impacts on women and feminist movements as a whole. Bayley writes that Carter had created "a new kind of persona for real women to copy." He calls this the "Carter girl of the Eighties" who is recognizable due to "her sound principles, earthy humor, and warm heart."
