= Fireworks: Nine Profane Pieces =

Anthology of short fiction by Angela Carter

- First edition
- Author: Angela Carter
- Language: English
- Publisher: Quartet Books
- Publication date: 1974
- Publication place: United Kingdom
- Media type: Print (paperback)
- ISBN: 1-84408-367-5
- OCLC: 68772482

Fireworks: Nine Profane Pieces (aka Fireworks: Nine Stories in Various Disguises or Fireworks) is an anthology of short fiction by Angela Carter. It was first published in the United Kingdom in 1974 by Quartet Books Ltd. and contains a collection of stories, several of which are based on Carter's own experiences of living in Japan from 1969 to 1971. Carter wrote in Nothing Sacred: Selected Writings: "In Japan I learnt what it is to be a woman and became radicalised." In 1988, the collection was also published in Canada under the name Artificial Fire, which featured both Fireworks and the 1971 novel Love.

Stories included are: "A Souvenir of Japan", "The Executioner's Beautiful Daughter", "The Loves of Lady Purple", "The Smile of Winter", "Penetrating to the Heart of the Forest", "Flesh and the Mirror", "Master", "Reflections" and "Elegy for a Freelance".

The anthology's contents are also reprinted in the volume Burning Your Boats, which features all of Carter's short fiction.

== Plot summaries ==
=== A Souvenir of Japan ===
An English woman living in Tokyo details an affair with a younger Japanese man. As she tries to understand the fragile beauty that exists within their relationship, she examines the wider role of women in society, describing Japan as "a man's country". This story is semi-autobiographical.

=== The Executioner's Beautiful Daughter ===
In a small upland village, incest is a crime so rife that the entire community has been shunned by other towns, and while the penalty for the crime is death, there is one who can commit it with impunity. The executioner is a law to himself, killing his son for raping his daughter, but committing the same crime himself.

=== The Loves of Lady Purple ===
An Asiatic Professor travels west across Europe performing a marionette show. The tragic tale of Lady Purple; orphan, murderer of her foster parents, prostitute. As the years have gone by, he has grown evermore frail, but the puppet's movements have grown more fluid. She finally becomes real; feeding on his blood and burning the body, she leaves to find a brothel, for she can only be what he has made her.

=== The Smile of Winter ===
An English woman spends a winter living on a rural coastline in Japan. Having come to the beach in order to be lonely, she uses the different elements of her surroundings to portray their indifference to her.

=== Penetrating to the Heart of the Forest ===
A sister and brother live in an Eden-like paradise, a place defined by their prepubescent innocence. As they grow older, the mysterious forest that surrounds them becomes even more alluring, and they explore its depths finding, at last, a tree bearing a beautifully ripe fruit; when they eat it, they notice the curves of each other's changing bodies.

=== Flesh and the Mirror ===
A woman returning to Tokyo searches fruitlessly for her lover, who has failed to meet up with her. Finding another man, she attempts to recreate that lost intimacy in the mirror above a hotel room bed.

=== Master ===
A great white hunter comes to the Americas in order to hunt jaguars. He takes a female slave, whom he names "Friday", and whom he also rapes. She, feeling a supernatural connection with the jaguar that he kills, eventually shoots and kills her "master".

=== Reflections ===
A boy goes on a Through the Looking-Glass-like adventure into a bizarre, reversed world. He encounters an elderly woman who is intersex, and is raped by a girl in a forest before ultimately escaping.

=== Elegy for a Freelance ===
A nameless revolutionary describes the lives of herself and her cohorts. As they prepare to commit an act of political terrorism, she relates the interactions that they have with their idiosyncratic neighbours.
