= Anagrams of Desire =

Academic textbook about Angela Carter's media writings

Anagrams of Desire: Angela Carter's Writing for Radio, Film and Television
- Front Cover of Anagrams of Desire (MUP, 2003)
- Author: Charlotte Crofts
- Language: English
- Subject: Angela Carter's dramatic writings
- Genre: Academic Text Book
- Publisher: Manchester University Press (MUP) distributed by University of British Columbia Press (UBC Press)
- Publication date: 2003
- Publication place: United Kingdom
- Pages: 224pp
- ISBN: 0-7190-5724-8
- OCLC: 50783384
- Dewey Decimal: 822/.914 21
- LC Class: PR6053.A73 Z575 2003

Anagrams of Desire is an academic textbook about Angela Carter's media writings. Written by Charlotte Crofts and published by Manchester University Press in 2003, the full title is Anagrams of Desire: Angela Carter's Writing for Radio, Film and Television.

The book examines Carter's five radio plays, her two film adaptations, The Company of Wolves (1984) and The Magic Toyshop (1987) and discusses the critically neglected television documentary The Holy Family Album (1991) and the BBC 2 Omnibus documentary about Carter: Angela Carter's Curious Room (1992). The book concludes with a brief discussion of Carter's unrealised dramatic writings, a libretto of Virginia Woolf's Orlando, a stage adaptation of Frank Wedekind's Lulu plays (Erdgeist et al.) and an unproduced screenplay entitled The Christchurch Murders, based on the Parker-Hulme New Zealand murders, the same incident which influenced Peter Jackson's film Heavenly Creatures.

The title refers to a line from Carter's short story "The Merchant of Shadows", which concerns film-making and film-makers.
