= Black Venus =

Black Venus may refer to:

- Black Venus (2010 film), a French film based on the life of Sarah Baartman, a Khoikhoi woman exhibited in Europe under the name "Hottentot Venus"
- Black Venus (1983 film), a film directed by Claude Mulot
- Black Venus (short story collection), an anthology of short fiction by Angela Carter
- Black Venus, a novel by Jef Geeraerts
- The Black Venus, a novel by Rhys Davies
- Black Venus, a composition for guitar by Philip Cashian
- Black Venus, a nickname of opera singer Grace Bumbry
- Black Venus, a nickname for Lola Falana, an American singer, dancer, model and actress
- Black Venus, code name of South Korean intelligence agent Park Chae-seo, inspiration of the 2018 film The Spy Gone North
