= Several Perceptions =

1968 novel by Angela Carter

- First edition (publ. Heinemann)
- Author: Angela Carter
- Language: English
- Publication date: 1968

Several Perceptions is a 1968 novel by the author Angela Carter. Her novels Shadow Dance (1966), Several Perceptions and Love (1971) are sometimes referred to as the "Bristol Trilogy". The title is from David Hume, 'The mind is a kind of theatre, where several perceptions make their appearance...' The novel won a Somerset Maugham Award for new literature in 1968

== Synopsis ==
Several Perceptions is Angela Carter's third novel and forms a thematic "Bristol trilogy" set in the southwestern English port city, along with her works Shadow Dance and Love. The novel centres on a loose string of vignettes related to Joseph Harker, a university student drop out and self-proclaimed nihilist. In addition to his academic failure, he has also broken up with his girlfriend, who is a voracious reader of Jane Austen's work and is employed caring for elderly male residents at a city nursing home. Early in the novel, he attempts suicide, but this also fails. He is influenced by the emotional ambience of the concurrent Vietnam War, as well as random environmental stimuli such as his pregnant cat purring, the breasts of a local woman, custard and memories of his grandfather. In his vignettes, Joseph falls in love with his best friend's mother, liberates a badger from a local city zoo and mails a parcel of his own excrement to then-US President Lyndon Baines Johnson It is probable that Joseph is experiencing either schizophrenia or cognitive dissonance related to drug addiction, given the episodic nature of his consciousness and rapid transitions of focus described in this novel. However. Joseph gradually becomes lucid again and is welcomed back into his former social networks at a riotous and anarchic Christmas party at the end of the novel
