= Heroes and Villains (novel) =

1969 novel by Angela Carter

- First edition (publ. Heinemann)
- Author: Angela Carter
- Genre: Post-apocalyptic fiction
- Publisher: Simon & Schuster
- Publication date: January 1, 1969
- ISBN: 978-0-434-10954-8

Heroes and Villains is a 1969 post-apocalyptic novel by Angela Carter.

== Synopsis ==
In a post-apocalyptic world, Marianne inhabits an enclave of relative civilisation as the daughter of one of the "Professors", academic survivors of the unnamed global disaster, whose enclave is guarded by a soldier caste. At the beginning of the novel, Marianne has lost her brother and mother, and only her father survives. However, she has become tired of the sedentary lifestyle and runs away from the enclave to join Jewel, an articulate and intelligent leader of a barbarian tribe, but then becomes concerned at her chattel status in a society that has rigid patriarchal concepts of what constitutes appropriate gender roles. Marianne becomes pregnant after Jewel sexually assaults her but she then sexually assaults an intellectually disabled male tribal member. Ultimately Jewel dies, and Marianne plans to become tribal leader.

== Reception ==
Writing for The New York Times, Richard Boston found Heroes and Villains to be "a strange, compelling book ... a fable that discusses the roles of reason and imagination in a civilized society." He reported it to be "an undoubted success," saying "Carter tells her story with considerable skill. Her observation is sharp, and she writes extremely well."

Theodore Sturgeon reviewed the novel favourably, praising Carter's "vivid colour, her familiarity with her scene, the unexpectedness of her characters and plot development."
