= The March (1990 film) =

1990 British drama television film

- Genre: Drama
- Written by: William Nicholson
- Directed by: David Wheatley
- Starring: Juliet Stevenson; Malick Bowens; Joseph Mydell; Sverre Anker Ousdal
- Composer: Richard Hartley

Production
- Cinematography: John Hooper
- Running time: 100 minutes

Original release
- Network: BBC1
- Release: 20 May 1990

The March is a 1990 British drama film directed by David Wheatley that was originally aired by BBC1 for "One World Week". The plot concerns a charismatic Muslim leader from Sudan who leads 250,000 Africans on a 3,000-mile march towards Europe with the slogan "We are poor because you are rich."

== Reception ==
The film's production resulted in complaints from French author Jean Raspail, alleging similarities to his 1973 novel, The Camp of the Saints. However, the film's producers said they had no knowledge of Raspail's novel when they began their project.
