= Burning Your Boats =

Collection of short stories by Angela Carter

- First edition cover (publ. by Chatto & Windus)
- Author: Angela Carter
- Publisher: Chatto & Windus
- Publication date: July 20, 1995
- ISBN: 978-0-701-16321-1

Burning Your Boats: The Collected Short Stories (1995) is a posthumously-published collection of short stories by English writer Angela Carter. It includes stories previously collected in her other short story collections: Fireworks: Nine Profane Pieces (1974), The Bloody Chamber and Other Stories (1979), Black Venus (aka Saints and Strangers) (1985) and American Ghosts and Old World Wonders (1993) as well as six previously un-collected stories. The book also includes an introduction by author Salman Rushdie.

The collection consists of:

- Early Work, 1962-6

"The Man Who Loved a Double Bass", "A Very, Very Great Lady and Her Son at Home" and "A Victorian Fable (with Glossary)".

- Fireworks: Nine Profane Pieces (1974)

"A Souvenir of Japan", "The Executioner's Beautiful Daughter", "The Loves of Lady Purple", "The Smile of Winter", "Penetrating to the Heart of the Forest", "Flesh and the Mirror", "Master", "Reflections" and "Elegy for a Freelance".

- The Bloody Chamber (1979)

"The Bloody Chamber", "The Courtship of Mr Lyon", "The Tiger's Bride", "Puss-in-Boots", "The Erl-King", "The Snow Child", "The Lady of the House of Love", "The Werewolf, "The Company of Wolves" and "Wolf-Alice".

- Black Venus (aka "Saints and Strangers") (1985)

"Black Venus", "The Kiss", "Our Lady of the Massacre", "The Cabinet of Edgar Allan Poe", "Overture and Incidental Music for A Midsummer Night's Dream", "Peter and the Wolf", "The Kitchen Child" and "The Fall River Axe Murders".

- American Ghosts and Old World Wonders (1993)

"Lizzie's Tiger", "John Ford's 'Tis Pity She's a Whore", "Gun for the Devil", "The Merchant of Shadows", "The Ghost Ships", "In Pantoland", "Ashputtle or The Mother's Ghost", "Alice in Prague or The Curious Room" and "Impressions: The Wrightsman Magdalene".

- Uncollected Stories, 1970-81

"The Scarlet House", "The Snow Pavilion" and "The Quilt Maker".
