= The Curious Room =

Book of dramatic works by Angela Carter

Cover of the first edition, published by Chatto & Windus.

The Curious Room: Plays, Film Scripts and an Opera is a collection of dramatic works by English writer Angela Carter, published posthumously by Chatto and Windus in 1996.

Edited and with production notes provided by Mark Bell, with an introduction by Susannah Clapp, the contents include her original film screenplays for The Company of Wolves and The Magic Toyshop, both adapted from her own stories. Additional contents include a libretto for an opera based on Orlando: A Biography by Virginia Woolf, as well as five radio plays: "Vampirella", which she then reworked as "The Lady of the House of Love" in The Bloody Chamber collection; "The Company of Wolves"; "Puss in Boots" (both reworkings of Charles Perrault's fairy tales); and two "artificial biographies", one of Victorian painter Richard Dadd, and the other of Edwardian novelist Ronald Firbank. The collection also includes the unproduced screenplays Gun for the Devil (based upon an earlier short work of hers, collected in American Ghosts and Old World Wonders) and The Christchurch Murders (based on the Parker–Hulme murder case, which also influenced the 1994 Peter Jackson film Heavenly Creatures), as well a stage adaptation of Frank Wedekind's Lulu plays.
