= American Ghosts and Old World Wonders =

1993 short story collection by Angela Carter

- First edition (publ. Chatto & Windus)
- Author: Angela Carter
- Publisher: Chatto & Windus
- Publication date: 1993
- ISBN: 978-0-701-14003-8

American Ghosts and Old World Wonders is a posthumously published anthology of short fiction by English novelist Angela Carter. It was first published in the United Kingdom in 1993 by Chatto & Windus. and contains a collection of nine stories, half of which deal with American folklore, with others dealing with older myths and fairytales. It is introduced by Susannah Clapp.

The book is divided into two parts, the first (concerned with the United States) consists of "Lizzie's Tiger", "John Ford's 'Tis Pity She's a Whore", "Gun for the Devil" and "The Merchant of Shadows".

Part two (concerned with Europe: the "Old World") contains "The Ghost Ships", "In Pantoland", "Ashputtle or The Mother's Ghost", "Alice in Prague or The Curious Room" and "Impressions: The Wrightsman Magdalene".

The anthology's contents are also reprinted in the volume Burning Your Boats, which features all of Carter's short fiction.
