= The Donkey Prince =

Children's story by Angela Carter

First edition (US)

The Donkey Prince is a short children's story written by Angela Carter. Illustrated by Eros Keith (who also the illustrator of Carter's Miss Z, the Dark Young Lady), it was first published in the United States by Simon & Schuster in 1970.

It is based on the fairy tale The Donkey by the Brothers Grimm. The illustrated version is currently out of print, but the story itself can be found in "Don't Bet on the Prince" (1987) by Jack Zipes.
