= The Passion of New Eve =

1977 novel by Angela Carter

- First UK edition
- Author: Angela Carter
- Language: English
- Genre: Magic realism, post-feminism
- Publisher: Victor Gollancz Ltd
- Publication date: 1977
- Publication place: United Kingdom
- Media type: Print (hardback & paperback)
- Pages: 191 pp
- ISBN: 0-575-02247-7
- OCLC: 3084789
- Dewey Decimal: 823/.9/14
- LC Class: PZ4.C3232 Pas 1977b PR6053.A73

The Passion of New Eve is a novel by Angela Carter, first published in 1977. The book is set in a dystopian United States where civil war has broken out between different political, racial and gendered groups. A dark satire, the book parodies primitive notions of gender, sexual difference and identity from a post-feminist perspective. Other major themes include sadomasochism and the politics of power. Carter described the book as feminist black comedy.

== Background ==
Carter began work on The Passion of New Eve in January 1972, inspired in part by the Greek myth of Tiresias, who was turned into a woman as a punishment from the goddess Hera. Originally, the book had the title The Great Hermaphrodite and was set in ancient Rome; she later moved the setting to a post-apocalyptic United States.

== Plot summary ==
At the start of the novel, Evelyn, a male English professor, is taking up a new post in a university in New York. His tribute to Tristessa de St Ange, a (fictional) American silent movie star, on his last night in England is to be given fellatio by a girl he takes to see one of her films.

He arrives in a dystopian New York, a city in its last stages of rotting death, overrun by huge rats and human emotions distilled to their most primeval. The job that he has been offered at a university falls through after the school is taken over by a militant black rebel group. He is then left destitute in the middle of New York with very little money and no job. Evelyn then befriends a Czech neighbour, Baroslav, who is an alchemist. Baroslav is killed by a group of men in the city and Evelyn is then left alone. On a late night run to the local drug store he meets Leilah. He becomes fascinated with Leilah, an exotic young African-American night club dancer, and he follows her home through the city. He lives with her and they have a short sexual relationship where he frequently abuses her. He makes no emotional link, seeing her only in terms of sex. He writes to his parents and finds out that he is left a lot of money from a recently deceased relative. He becomes repelled by Leilah after he impregnated her, and he then abandons her to a voodoo abortionist. The abortion goes wrong and Leilah is put in hospital. Evelyn is expected to pay a large fee for Leilah's hospital bills, but only plans on using some of the money. The rest Leilah gets from selling her fur coats. After Evelyn withdraws the money to pay for the bill, he is mugged and beaten by a group of young men. At the last moment, they are scared away before they can find the wad of cash Evelyn has taped under his genitals. He sends Leilah red roses, then rents a bulletproof car and heads straight to the desert, leaving everything behind including Leilah.

Evelyn seeks out the clean, clear desert and is captured by a woman from the subterranean female city of Beulah and dragged across the sandscape to encounter Mother, a mother goddess figure who fashioned herself with the surgeon's knife. She operates on Evelyn, removing his genitals and implants a fully functioning vagina and ovaries, as well as giving him breast augmentation surgery. She plans on impregnating him with a new Messiah, using his own sperm that she harvested from him before the operation. The transformation from male to female seems to be absolute, despite the fact that Eve struggles to learn to become the woman that her body is, and from this point on she is referred to only in female pronouns.

Eve escapes but is captured, raped, and enslaved by Zero, a cruel male cult leader and "poet" with only one eye and one leg. His harem are all passive, slavish "wives" who he whips unless they talk in grunts and honour their bedfellows, the pigs. Zero leads Eve on a search for the silent film star Tristessa, an embodiment of beauty, sorrow, and loneliness, whom he hates obsessively, because he believes Tristessa has made him infertile. Tristessa was Evelyn's first object of desire in his boyhood, and Eve still has her own obsession with this figure.

Zero leads his dungaree-clad harem to the glass palace of Tristessa and invades the beautiful gothic pile, discovering Tristessa herself laid out in a room surrounded by waxwork effigies in coffins. However she is alive and only when Zero tracks her down to the top of one of the towers and cuts her thong do the gang discover that Tristessa is male.

Upon discovering this, Zero and his wives create a mock-up wedding ceremony and marry the two, forcing Tristessa to rape Eve. Eve and Tristessa escape, killing Zero and his harem with Tristessa's spinning glass palace. They escape back into the desert where they imbibe each other's newly discovered sexuality and fall in love through their realisation that they are Tiresias. Tristessa is shot by a passing band of soldiers. Their Colonel is 14 years old and scared of the dark. They "rescue" Eve, but she escapes and encounters Leilah in a new guise of Lilith, vagabond rebel leader.

Lilith takes Eve to the coast to meet with Mother again. Here they see an old lady on a beach—a manifestation of ageing superficiality: caked in make-up, with piled high golden locks, singing old musical songs.

Eve realises that Leilah never objectively existed but was only a manifestation of his own lusts and corruption.

Lilith tells Eve she must go and meet The Mother and pushes her into a cleft in the rocks that metamorphoses into the uterus of time. Eve progresses through the increasingly deep and warm subterranean rock pools to her rebirth. The amber Eve discovers in one of the caves and holds in her hands liquifies into ancient pine forests and primeval species.

Eve is then symbolically reborn, guided by Leilah, and rejects her chauvinistic male past.

Eve emerges onto a beach by Lilith, who leaves her to go back and fight with her rebels, saying Eve cannot join her because she is pregnant. Eve swaps the gold alchemical on a neck chain that Lilith has given her for the purple skiff belonging to the crazed old woman and takes the boat and sails away.
