= Love (Carter novel) =

1971 novel by Angela Carter

- First edition
- Author: Angela Carter
- Language: English
- Publisher: Rupert Hart-Davis
- Publication date: 1971
- Publication place: United Kingdom
- Media type: Print (Hardback & Paperback)
- Pages: 124
- ISBN: 0-246-64036-7

Love is a 1971 novel by Angela Carter. Her fifth novel, it follows the destructive love triangle between a psychologically unstable woman, her charming husband, and her volatile brother-in-law. Effectively exploring themes of infidelity, self-loathing, suicide, and emotional disconnection, the novel depicts three characters so alienated from society and reality, that they depend solely on each other. This unhealthy fixation slowly eats away at their individual relationships and themselves, until eventually culminating in despair and tragedy.

Carter's novels Shadow Dance (1966), Several Perceptions (1968) and Love are sometimes referred to as the "Bristol Trilogy".
