= Andrew Marshall =

Andrew Marshall may refer to:

== Entertainment and media ==
- Andrew Marshall (screenwriter) (born 1954), British comedy screenwriter
- Andrew Marshall (print journalist) (born 1967), British journalist specialising in South East Asia
- Andrew MacGregor Marshall (born 1971), Scottish journalist and writer

== Sports ==
- Andrew Marshall (American football guard) (1879–1965), American football player
- Andrew Marshall (Canadian football) (born 1990), Canadian football player
- Andrew Marshall (cornerback) (born 2005), American football player
- Andrew Marshall (golfer) (born 1973), English professional golfer
- Andrew Marshall (soccer) (born 1984), American footballer

== Others ==
- Andrew Marshall (foreign policy strategist) (1921–2019), American foreign policy strategist

== See also ==
- Andy Marshall (born 1975), English football goalkeeper
- Drew Marshall (born 1966), Canadian radio presenter
- Andrew Marshal (1742–1813), Scottish physician and anatomist
