= Shadow Dance (novel) =

1966 first novel by Angela Carter

First edition

Shadow Dance was Angela Carter's first novel, published in England by Heinemann in 1966. It was published under the name Honeybuzzard in the United States. Upon publication it was acclaimed by Anthony Burgess, who wrote that he "read this book with admiration, horror and other relevant emotions... Angela Carter has remarkable descriptive gifts, a powerful imagination, and... a capacity for looking at the mess of contemporary life without flinching."

Carter's novels Shadow Dance, Several Perceptions (1968) and Love (1971) are sometimes referred to as the "Bristol Trilogy".

== Plot summary ==
A man named Morris Gray is out one night at a bar when he is accosted by a young teenager named Ghislaine. Once a beautiful girl whom Morris cheated on his wife with, she now bears a disfiguring scar running from her left eyebrow down the length of her body and Morris quickly flees from her and her suggestions that they resume their affair.

Morris heads home to his sickly wife, Edna, who passes on a message from Morris' friend, Honeybuzzard, saying he's gone to London, leaving the ramshackle shop which they co-own in Morris' care for the time being. Morris and Edna's relationship is clearly strained and, leaving her in bed to rest, Morris goes into their living room and takes down a history book from the bookshelf in there. He retrieves from the book a hidden envelope containing scandalous photos Honeybuzzard took of Ghislaine and himself before her scarring and Morris proceeds to vandalise them all by drawing her scar onto each one. Disgusted at himself for doing this, Morris hides the photos back in the book and proceeds to fall asleep, experiencing a nightmare in which he attacks Ghislaine with a shard of broken glass, only for her to transform into Edna. We learn that Edna describes Morris to people as a painter, due to his interest in painting, though he himself does not consider any of his art to be any good. He struggles to handle the love she dutifully gives to him, which he is unable to reciprocate. Edna would like to have a child with Morris, but he's unwilling to commit to raising one with her.

The next day, while Edna works a job at a cigarette factory, Morris spends her earnings at an auction sale buying junk with which to stock his and Honeybuzzard's store. Though they refer to it is an antique shop, most of its contents are acquired by bidding at these auctions or robbing recently vacated houses. Morris meets an acquaintance, Oscar, at the auction and, though they don't get on very well, the pair do flee together when Ghislaine arrives unexpectedly.

In a dingy café, Oscar probes Morris to find the source of Ghislaine's disfigurement. Morris maintains to Oscar that she was attacked by a group of young hooligans after walking through town wearing nothing but an overcoat. However, she was actually scarred by Honeybuzzard, whom Morris directed her towards after her callousness upset him. As Honeybuzzard is quite self-obsessed, Morris hoped she would get a taste of her own medicine. Though he never expected Honeybuzzard to do what he did, Morris still harbours significant guilt for his part in Ghislaine's pain.

Days pass and the hot, spring weather intensifies Morris' depression. He spends his days hiding in places he thinks Ghislaine will never go and musing on how ardently he has resisted giving Edna the things she wants from a relationship: namely a strong, traditional husband and children. One evening, Morris finally tells Edna about his interaction with Ghislaine in the bar. Though she first thinks he is preparing to leave her, once Edna realises Morris' disgust at Ghislaine's appearance, she demands that they take Ghislaine in and care for her during what must be a difficult time. It is only when Morris aggressively refuses to cooperate with this plan that Edna seems to show slight respect for him.

One morning, Morris sees a striking, aloof young woman enter the café he visited with Oscar previously. She's carrying a large, sleeping cat and is accompanied by an outrageously-dressed Honeybuzzard. The woman is introduced as Emily and it's clear she and Honeybuzzard began a relationship while he was in London. Morris tries to warn Honeybuzzard about what's been happening with Ghislaine, but Honeybuzzard shows no interest in the topic until Oscar arrives. Oscar reminds them of Henry Glass, another of Ghislaine's past conquests, now happily married to a Finnish woman who speaks limited English. Oscar explains that Ghislaine visited Henry one night and, in despair after being turned away by him, tore her scar open and stuffed dirt into the wound, re-hospitalising herself in the process. Though he says he appreciates the update, Honeybuzzard is more excited to share his recent purchases from a London joke shop with the two men, much to their dismay. Honeybuzzard further mocks Oscar before leaving with Morris and Emily to visit their antique shop.

The shop, situated in a rundown part of town, is worse for wear, though Emily soon sets about tidying parts of it up while her cat makes itself at home. Honeybuzzard finds a letter there from Ghislaine expressing her love for him, which he says isn't nearly enough to earn his affection back. He burns the letter and starts unpacking all of his other joke shop purchases before getting bored and leaving Morris to finish the job. Instead, Honeybuzzard tries on outfits and constructs a doll in Morris' likeness, which he soon discards once something else catches his attention. This, along with a short bout of rain, causes Morris to ruminate on various negative feelings he has for the people in his life. He ultimately suppresses these feelings and the trio go to the pub that evening.

There, they find Henry Glass distraught over his pregnant wife's suicide. Unable to understand Henry's explanation of the situation with Ghislaine, Henry's wife thought Henry had scarred the girl and became distraught at this possibility, resulting in her taking her own life. Back at the antique shop, Emily asks Honeybuzzard who Ghislaine is. He lies and says she's just a friend of Morris' before he and Morris set off without Emily to scavenge abandoned items from a set of houses they hear are due to be demolished.

On the drive over to the houses, Morris expresses pity for the people hurt by the recent events, for which Honeybuzzard admonishes him, claiming those people are just shadows and therefore don't deserve any of Morris' concern.

They spend the night hunting through the houses for Victorian era paraphernalia, which they plan to clean up and sell to American tourists, who seem to delight in anything related to England's past. They're not particularly successful in their searching, but do find an elaborate mirror, too large to move, which inspires the pair to dance with each other, leading to Honeybuzzard firmly embracing Morris. This triggers Morris' fear of Ghislaine and he instinctively lashes out at Honeybuzzard, ruining the moment. The two leave the house dejected, but by the time they reach the antique store Honeybuzzard is excited again, this time to spend the rest of the night having sex with Emily. Morris goes home to find Edna sobbing to herself. She had visited Ghislaine in hospital, where Ghislaine had rejected her compassion. Morris comforts Edna as best he can.

As time goes on, Morris finds himself regularly visiting the dingy café alone to spend time with an elderly waitress, who he becomes quite fond of.

One day, Emily, who has always loved cleanliness, is trying to clean more of the antique shop when she discovers a room in it which contains Morris' paintings. Morris finds her in there and they have their first somewhat amicable conversation. After learning she comes from a large, Catholic family, Morris is shocked when Emily expresses passionate love for Honeybuzzard and feels uneasy around her after this encounter, though her behaviour remains unchanged.

While Morris and Edna grow further apart over summer, he starts to notice he and Honeybuzzard are becoming pariahs around town as well. One day, Honeybuzzard reveals to Morris that Ghislaine is out of hospital and has moved to St. Ives. By night, the pair continue visiting the houses due to be demolished in order to get more stock for their shop.

Early one morning, a group of townsfolk led by Henry Glass come to attack the shop while Honeybuzzard and Morris hide inside, but the crowd are deterred by the appearance of a patrolling police officer. Honeybuzzard guesses this was because the townsfolk think Morris and Honeybuzzard attacked Ghislaine together. Later that day, Emily mentions to Morris that Oscar visited the store while he wasn't there. Oscar told Emily that Edna is a good woman whom Morris mistreats and threatened to show Emily copies of the scandalous photos Honeybuzzard took of himself and Ghislaine, which Honeybuzzard had previously sold to Oscar. He also asked Emily to warn Morris that Edna has been seen taking care of Henry Glass. Morris tries to warn Honeybuzzard about all this, but Honeybuzzard brushes it off, focusing instead on making dolls in the likeness of Oscar and a scarred Ghislaine. Honeybuzzard suggests to Morris that Ghislaine may return to town in Autumn, based on another letter he's received from her.

One night in late summer, Honeybuzzard and Morris search through what they think is an abandoned religious hostel. While there, Honeybuzzard fantasises about sexually assaulting Ghislaine atop a fallen statue of Christ on a crucifix and mentions to Morris that she's a clergyman's daughter, which he thinks goes some way to explaining her past behaviour. The two men find the elderly waitress from the café living in the basement of this building and, on a whim, Honeybuzzard shrieks at her. This causes her to go into some kind of shock, with Morris fearing she may be dying. He rushes outside to find a phonebox with which to call an ambulance, but Honeybuzzard tackles him to the ground. Threatening Morris with the same knife he used on Ghislaine, Honeybuzzard explains that trying to help the woman will lead to police investigation, and he's not willing to risk that. The two fight briefly but it ends when the wind blows a discarded newspaper into Morris' face, distracting Honeybuzzard due to how funny he finds it. Despite Morris' protestations, Honeybuzzard forces him to return to the shop without doing anything to help the old woman.

Back at the shop in the early hours of the morning, Honeybuzzard heavily sedates Morris in an attempt to make him fall asleep quicker and then goes to bed himself. The sedation doesn't work and, disrupted by Morris' sorrowful moaning, Emily leaves Honeybuzzard in bed and goes to comfort him. Morris tearfully tells Emily about how his mother and he were victims of the wartime bombing of a hotel when he was seven years old. He's unsure whether this killed his mother or whether she used the chaos as a chance to abandon him, but either way he never saw her again after this. He mentions how his mother would have looked much like the woman he and Honeybuzzard may have just killed if she was still alive. To try and soothe him, Emily sleeps with Morris, which finally succeeds in making him fall asleep.

The following morning, Morris heads home to Edna, leaving an unwell Emily to tend to the shop. After throwing up several times, Emily catches sight of Ghislaine loitering outside. When Ghislaine sees movement within the store, she demands to be let in and Emily obliges.

At home, Morris finds Henry and Edna asleep in bed together. Without waking them, Morris writes Edna a goodbye note wishing the two of them the best and then hurriedly leaves. In the café, Morris finds the old waitress alive and well and, in a burst of joyous relief, buys some flowers as a gift for Emily. Morris decides he's going to leave town, with the shop being his last stop before doing so. He reasons he can give Emily the floral gift and say goodbye to Honeybuzzard at the same time.

At the shop, Morris finds Emily destroying all of Honeybuzzard's belongings and burning all of his clothes. She explains that Ghislaine told her various questionably true stories about Honeybuzzard, made Emily kiss her scar and showed Emily the scandalous photos of her and Honeybuzzard, while assuring Emily that Honeybuzzard will attack her too if she ever does anything to displease him. Honeybuzzard then appeared and Ghislaine threw herself at his feet, begging him to be her master, at which point he abandoned Emily to run off with Ghislaine.

After this, a trip to the doctors had confirmed for Emily that she was pregnant with Honeybuzzard's child and so she clarifies that she's destroying his things in retaliation for him impregnating her. Morris asks if Emily wants to abort the pregnancy and she says no, but she does expect Honeybuzzard to cover the costs of her return to London. She makes breakfast for herself and Morris before having him clean up the shop under her direction.

By the evening, it's clear Honeybuzzard isn't going to return to the shop and Morris suspects he has taken Ghislaine to the religious hostel to fulfil his fantasy. Morris and Emily proceed to the hostel and find, in a room full of lit candles, Ghislaine's corpse laid on a table and covered with a tablecloth. They see Honeybuzzard bringing the sculpture of Christ to Ghislaine's body, but he doesn't see them and they manage to leave the hostel safely.

While Emily goes to phone the police, Morris considers that Honeybuzzard has done what Morris always wanted to do: kill Ghislaine. He then worries that his rejection of Honeybuzzard back when they danced together may have led to this outcome and turns to go back into the hostel, to support Honeybuzzard.
