= The Magic Toyshop =

1967 novel by Angela Carter

- First edition
- Author: Angela Carter
- Language: English
- Genre: Literary fiction
- Publisher: Heinemann
- Publication date: 1967
- Publication place: United Kingdom
- Media type: Print (hardback)
- Pages: vi, 200 pp
- ISBN: 978-0-434-10950-0

The Magic Toyshop (1967) is the second novel by British author Angela Carter. It follows the development of the heroine, Melanie, as she becomes aware of herself, her environment, and her own sexuality.

== Plot summary ==
The novel starts with Melanie stealing her mother's wedding dress and venturing out in the night into her family's property. However, on her way home, she realises she forgot the door key and is forced to climb up a tree to get back into her room, destroying the dress in the process. The next morning, Melanie learns of the unexpected deaths of her parents in a plane crash over the Grand Canyon, and she and her two siblings – Victoria and Jonathon – are moved to South London, to the care of her tyrannical uncle Philip, a bullish and eccentric maker of life-sized puppets and fantastical old fashioned toys. There, she meets her mute aunt Margaret, who is mistreated by and terrified of her husband and only converses through notes. She also meets Margaret's younger brothers Francie, a fiddler, and the rakish Finn. At first, Uncle Philip ignores Melanie and her siblings as they are introduced to his bizarre puppet shows and she is made to work selling toys in the toyshop. Meanwhile, Finn and Melanie grow closer until he takes her to a park which is the ruins of the National Exhibition of 1852. There, after seeing a worn, fallen statue of Queen Victoria and walking across a chess board (only on the white squares), Finn kisses Melanie. She feels intruded on by the gesture, imagining it to be romantic only as an observer from far away. The kiss begins Melanie's conflicted feelings of attraction toward Finn.

At another puppet show, Finn fails to control his puppet and is thrown to the floor by Uncle Philip, who despises him. Satisfied that Finn shall never be adept at working the puppets, Uncle Philip devises a new plan, drafting Melanie to perform with the puppets. Philip assigns Finn to teach Melanie how to act on stage for the future show. During this time, Melanie notices a difference in Finn's behaviour. Whereas before he had been subtly rebellious, he now seems depleted of all resistance and resigned to Philip's control. Finn also becomes even more physically dirty than before. However, Finn's opposition to Philip returns when he refuses to make love to Melanie, as he considers this to be part of Philip's machinations.

Soon the day of the puppet show arrives. Melanie appears on stage in a white dress. Philip has arranged for Melanie to play Leda as she is raped by the god Jove in the guise of a monstrous swan. However, the play is not successful, as Melanie struggles to beat off the swan. As she scrambles to escape the swan puppet, Finn calls for the end of the show. In a rage, Philip slaps Melanie and accuses her of ruining his show.

Shortly after the show, Uncle Philip goes on a business trip, taking Jonathon with him and leaving the rest of the family alone at the house. Finn decides to destroy Philip's puppet swan and buries it in the park next to the fallen Queen Victoria. He returns home and crawls into bed with Melanie. She comforts him and arrives at the realisation that they will someday marry and have children, leading a poor, constrained life together. Finn reaches a sort of epiphany about his life and decides to wash and not tolerate Uncle Philip's tyranny any more, something exemplified when Finn sits in Uncle Philip's seat at the dinner table. After a somewhat drunken evening, Melanie learns that Margaret and Francie have been having an incestuous relationship.

Suddenly Uncle Philip returns, discovering the infidelity of his wife and the rebellion of his household. In a tremendous rage, he sets the house on fire. Margaret finally speaks as she urges Finn and Melanie to escape. They do so just in time, running outside the house and turning to watch the floors of the house collapse in fire. They realise now that their old world is destroyed and, for better or worse, all they have left is each other.

== Film adaptation ==
The novel was filmed in 1987. It was produced by Steve Morrison and directed by David Wheatley. It was adapted for the screen by the author, Angela Carter, and starred Tom Bell, Caroline Milmoe, Killian McKenna, Patricia Kerrigan, and Lorcan Cranitch. Her collection, The Curious Room: Plays, Film Scripts and an Opera, contains Carter's script for the adaptation. The script and the film are discussed in Charlotte Crofts' book, Anagrams of Desire, drawing on an interview with director, David Wheatley.

== Theatre ==
Alan Harris adapted The Magic Toyshop into a stage play. It premiered in Cardiff, directed by Sita Calvert-Ennals, in May 2014.

== See also ==
- British literature
- Magical realism

== Sources ==
- Charlotte Crofts (2003), Anagrams of Desire: Angela Carter's Writing for Radio, Film and Television (Manchester University Press)
- Tuck, Donald H. (1974). The Encyclopedia of Science Fiction and Fantasy. Chicago: Advent. p. 94. ISBN 0-911682-20-1.
- AQA English Literature Exam (2010)
