= Nights at the Circus =

1984 novel by Angela Carter

- First edition
- Author: Angela Carter
- Cover artist: Barbara Kaiser
- Language: English
- Publisher: Chatto & Windus
- Publication date: 4 March 1984
- Publication place: United Kingdom
- Pages: 295
- ISBN: 0-14-007703-0
- OCLC: 12558119
- Dewey Decimal: 823/.914 19
- LC Class: PR6053.A73 N5 1986

Nights at the Circus is a novel by British writer Angela Carter, first published in 1984 and the winner of the 1984 James Tait Black Memorial Prize for fiction. The novel focuses on the life and exploits of Sophie Fevvers, a woman who is – or so she would have people believe – a Cockney virgin, hatched from an egg laid by unknown parents and ready to develop fully fledged wings. At the time of the story, she has become a celebrated aerialiste. She captivates the young journalist Jack Walser, who runs away with the circus and falls into a world that his journalistic exploits had not prepared him to encounter.

Nights at the Circus incorporates multiple categories of fiction, including postmodernism, magical realism, and postfeminism. As in her previous works, Carter plays with many literary aspects and dissects the traditional fairy tale structure.

In 1994, the novel was broadcast by BBC Radio 4 as a series of readings. It was read by Lesley Manville, abridged by Neville Teller and directed by Neil Cargill.

In 2006, it was adapted for the stage by Tom Morris and Emma Rice for the Kneehigh Theatre Company. The play was performed at the Lyric Hammersmith in London and the Bristol Old Vic before touring.

== Plot summary ==
=== London ===
Nights at the Circus begins with American journalist Jack Walser interviewing Sophie Fevvers in her London dressing room, following her performance in the circus which employs her. Fevvers claims to have been left as a baby in a basket on the doorstep of a brothel. Until she reached puberty she appeared to be an ordinary child, with the exception of a raised lump on each shoulder; as she begins menstruating, however, she also sprouted complete wings. As a child, she posed as a living statue of Cupid in the reception room of the brothel, but as an adolescent, she is now transformed into the image of the "Winged Victory" holding a sword belonging to Ma Nelson, the madam of the brothel. This stage of Fevvers' life comes to an abrupt end when Ma Nelson slips in the street and falls into the path of a carriage. The house and its contents are inherited by her pious brother who plans to convert it to a house for fallen women, but Ma Nelson's employees burn the place down and go their separate ways.

Fevvers continues her story, although doubt is cast on the veracity of her narrative voice throughout. She and Lizzie, she tells Walser, next move in with Lizzie's sister and help run the family ice cream parlour. However, when the family falls on hard times Fevvers accepts an invitation from the fearsome Madame Schreck. She puts Fevvers on display in her exclusive combination of freak show and brothel, along with several other women with unique appearances. After some time, Madame Schreck sells Fevvers to a customer, "Christian Rosencreutz", who wishes to sacrifice a winged 'virgo intacta' in order to procure his own immortality. Fevvers narrowly escapes and returns to Lizzie's sister's home. Soon after their reunion, she joins Colonel Kearney's circus as an aerialiste and achieves enormous fame. The London section concludes with Walser telling his chief at the London office that he is going to follow Fevvers, joining the circus on its grand imperial tour.

=== Petersburg ===
The Petersburg section begins as Walser, living in Clown Alley, types up his first impressions of the city. The reader learns that Walser approached Colonel Kearney who, taking advice from his fortune telling pig Sybil, offered him a position as a clown in the circus. The reader, and Walser, are introduced to the other members of the circus and Walser saves Mignon from being eaten by a tigress.

In the next scene the chief clown Buffo and his troupe invoke chaos at their dinner table. Walser ducks out of the meleé only to find Mignon waiting outside for him, as she has nowhere else to go after her husband and lover have both abandoned her. Not sure what to do with the abandoned woman, he takes her to Fevvers's hotel room. Fevvers assumes that Walser is sleeping with Mignon but, though jealous, takes care of the girl. On recognising the beauty of Mignon's singing voice Fevvers introduces her to the Princess of Abyssinia. The Princess, a silent tiger tamer, incorporates Mignon into her act with the dancing cats and Walser is recruited as partner to the redundant tigress. During rehearsals, the acrobatic Charivari family tries to kill Fevvers and the Colonel reluctantly kicks them out of the circus. Buffo the Great loses his mind during that night's performance and tries to kill Walser. The Princess has to shoot one of her tigresses when she becomes jealous of Mignon for dancing with her tiger mate during the tiger waltz. After her performance, Fevvers goes to a date at a mansion belonging to the Grand Duke. Here, she almost falls victim to his amorous advances but narrowly escapes into a Fabergé egg, reaching the circus train as it is about to pull out of the station. This last scene is deliberately bewildering, developing the sense of doubt cast upon the reader in Fevvers' early narrative and laying the foundations for the fantastic occurrences of the final section.

=== Siberia ===
The Siberian section opens with the entire circus crossing the continent to Asia. The train is attacked by a band of runaway outlaws who think that Fevvers can help them inform the Tsar of their plight, who will then allow them to return home to their villages. As the train is now destroyed, the entire circus, other than Walser, is marched to the convicts' encampment; Walser is rescued by a group of escaped murderesses and their former guards, who have become their lovers and helped them to escape. As Walser has amnesia, the band of women leaves him for an approaching rescue party but he flees into the woods before they reach him and is taken under the wing of a village shaman.

Fevvers and the rest of the party are being held captive by the convicts. Fevvers tells the convict leader that she cannot help them as everything that they have heard about her is a lie. Depressed, the convicts sink into drunken mourning. Lizzie convinces the clowns to put on a show for the convicts, during which a blizzard comes, blowing the clowns and the convicts away with it into the night. The remnants of the circus begin to walk in the direction in which they hope civilization lies. They come across a run-down music school and take shelter with its owner, the Maestro. A brief encounter with Walser, now thoroughly part of the shaman's village, convinces Fevvers and Lizzie to leave the safety of the Maestro's school to search for Walser. Colonel Kearney leaves the group to continue his quest for civilization so as to build another, and more successful, circus. Mignon, the Princess and Samson remain with the Maestro at his music school. Fevvers finds Walser and the story ends with them together at the moment that the new century dawns and Fevvers' victorious cry "to think I really fooled you".

== Characters ==
- Fevvers, christened Sophie – the self-defined winged aerialiste who acts as the focal point for the circus' success. She is six feet two inches tall, curvaceous, peroxide blonde.
- Jack Walser – a California native that stowed away on a departing ship at a young age. He became a journalist and interviewed Fevvers before running away with the circus to try to discover the truth of her story.
- Lizzie – Fevvers' adoptive mother, a former prostitute, and political activist/revolutionary who may have occult powers
- Ma Nelson – the well-loved proprietor of the bordello where Fevvers grew up
- Madame Schreck – The owner of a female freak show that also functioned as a whorehouse of sorts.
- Toussaint – The male servant of Madame Schreck who was born without a mouth
- Christian Rosencreutz – a rich religious maniac who believes Fevvers is a fallen angel and attempts to sacrifice her
- Colonel Kearney – The extravagant capitalist and owner of the circus
- Little Ivan – the son of Olga Alexandrovna; attempts to run away with the circus but is prevented from doing so by Walser
- Sybil – Colonel Kearney's pet pig, intelligent and clairvoyant, whom he unquestioningly relies on to make nearly all of his business decisions
- Princess of Abyssinia – The tiger tamer and piano player who falls in love with Mignon
- Monsieur Lamarck – Mignon's abusive alcoholic husband and the monkey trainer of the circus.
- Mignon – initially a circus hanger-on who transmutes into a beautiful singer who dances the waltz with tigers and falls in love with the Princess
- Samson – The strong man of the circus and Mignon's lover before she falls in love with the Princess
- The Professor – the head monkey who tricks Colonel Kearney into allowing the chimps to leave the circus
- Buffo the Great – The leader of the clowns
- The Charivaris – A family of trapeze artists and tightrope walkers who try to kill Fevvers out of jealousy and from then on carry a curse, doomed to never perform well again
- The Grand Duke – A member of the Russian aristocracy who unsettles and scares Fevvers with automata and insinuation to the point where she almost loses control of her own narrative
- Countess P. – a cruel and rich woman who kills her husband, gets away with it, but feels bad about the crime nonetheless. She builds a panopticon in Transbaikalia and tries to reform other murderesses but only succeeds in turning both the prisoners and the guards against her
- Olga Alexandrovna – a prisoner of the panopticon and the first to instigate contact with one of the guards. She is also the mother of little Ivan and finds Walser after the train wreck
- The Shaman – the spiritual leader of the village who takes Walser under his wing when he suffers from amnesia
- The Maestro – The master of a music school in Transbaikalia that has no students. He eventually provides shelter for what is left of the circus after they escape from the convict camp

== Literary significance and reception ==
Though it was one of the later books of her career, Nights at the Circus was the first to bring Angela Carter widespread acclaim, winning that year's James Tait Black Memorial Prize for fiction. Carter's penultimate novel was met with mixed reviews, some uncomfortable with the underlying politically driven content, while others praised it for its playfulness and originality. Many critics viewed Fevvers as a winged version of the New Woman, able to escape the trappings of a patriarchal nineteenth century and move on into the twentieth century of feminist liberation. However, some feminists were disappointed with the novel, criticizing it for upholding a post-feminist stance. Since Angela Carter's death in 1992, both the novel and her reputation have reached even greater levels of popularity. Since then, the novel has made its way onto many academic syllabi and was adapted for the stage by Tom Morris and Emma Rice in 2006.

Nights at the Circus inspired British musician Bishi's first album, which has the same title.

On 5 November 2019, the BBC News listed Nights at the Circus on its list of the 100 most influential novels.

== Awards and nominations ==
- 1984 James Tait Black Memorial Prize for Fiction
- 2012 Best of the James Tait Black, winner
