= Caroline Milmoe =

English actress

- Born: 11 January 1963 (age 63); Manchester, England
- Occupation: Actress
- Years active: 1986–2005

Caroline Milmoe (born 11 January 1963) is an English stage, film and television actress best known for playing Julie in the first two series of Carla Lane's Liverpool-based BBC sit-com Bread and Lisa Duckworth in ITV's long-running soap opera Coronation Street.

== Career ==
Milmoe attended Manchester's Contact Youth Theatre in her teens, before going on to make frequent stage and screen appearances in the mid-1980s and early '90s. She played reporter Maggie Troon in the second series of LWT's situation comedy Hot Metal. Written by David Renwick and Andrew Marshall, it satirised the 1980s tabloid press in Britain. Additionally, Milmoe appeared in The Magic Toyshop, The Bill and Agatha Christie's Poirot, On 18 December 2005, she appeared in Coronation Street: The Duckworth Family Album.

== Filmography ==
=== Film ===
Year	Film	Role	Director	Notes
1987	The Magic Toyshop	Melanie	David Wheatley	
1988	The Fruit Machine	Lillie	Philip Saville	
1988	Without a Clue	Constance	Thom Eberhardt	

=== Television ===
Year	Title	Role	Notes
1986–1987	Bread	Julie Jefferson	12 episodes
1986	The Practice	Sandra King	2.01 "Episode One"; 2.03 "Episode Three"; 2.06 "Episode Six"
1986	ScreenPlay	Maureen	1.03 "Brick Is Beautiful"
1987	Valentine Park	Cindy	1.04 "Episode Four"; 1.06 "Episode Six"
1988	Hot Metal	Maggie Troon	6 episodes
1989	The Bill	Laura	5.84 "Found Offending"
1990	Agatha Christie's Poirot	Mary Durrant	2.06 "Double Sin"
1991	Chernobyl: The Final Warning	Sonya	Television film
1991	The Bill	Bobby	7.91 "The Taste"
1992–1993	Coronation Street	Lisa Horton (later Duckworth)	Regular, 75 episodes
1993	ITV Comedy Playhouse	Hazel	1.04 "Stuck on You"
1995	Barbara	Linda Benson	1.0 "Job"
1998	The Bill	Nadia Collins	14.105 "Dog Eat Dog"
