= The Company of Wolves =

1984 British Gothic fantasy horror film

- Theatrical release poster
- Directed by: Neil Jordan
- Written by: Angela Carter; Neil Jordan
- Adaptation by: Angela Carter
- Based on: "The Company of Wolves" by Angela Carter
- Produced by: Chris Brown; Stephen Woolley
- Starring: Angela Lansbury; David Warner; Micha Bergese; Sarah Patterson
- Cinematography: Bryan Loftus
- Edited by: Rodney Holland
- Music by: George Fenton
- Production companies: Palace Pictures; ITC Entertainment
- Distributed by: ITC Entertainment
- Release dates: 15 September 1984 (Toronto Festival of Festivals); 21 September 1984 (UK)
- Running time: 95 minutes
- Country: United Kingdom
- Language: English
- Budget: £2 million
- Box office: $4.3 million (USA)

The Company of Wolves is a 1984 British Gothic fantasy-horror film directed by Neil Jordan and starring Angela Lansbury, David Warner, Micha Bergese, and Sarah Patterson in her film debut. The screenplay by Angela Carter and Jordan was adapted from her 1979 short story of the same name.

== Plot ==
In a present-day country house, Rosaleen, a young girl, dreams that she lives in a fairytale-like late 18th-century forest with her parents and sister Alice. There, wolves chase down Alice and kill her one night. While her parents are mourning, Rosaleen goes to stay with her grandmother, who knits a red shawl for her granddaughter to wear. The superstitious old woman gives Rosaleen an ominous warning, "Never stray from the path, never eat a windfall apple, and never trust a man whose eyebrows meet." Rosaleen returns to her village, but finds that she must deal with the advances of an amorous boy. Rosaleen and the boy walk through the forest, where he discovers that a wolf attacked the village's cattle. The villagers set out to hunt the wolf; but once caught and killed, the wolf's corpse transforms into that of a human being.

Rosaleen later takes a basket of goods through the woods to her grandmother's cottage, but en route she encounters a huntsman whose eyebrows meet. He challenges her, saying that he can find his way to the cottage before she can, and the pair set off. The hunter reaches the cottage first, reveals his bestial nature and kills Rosaleen's grandmother. Rosaleen arrives later and discovers the carnage, but her need to protect herself is complicated by her desire for the hunter. In the ensuing exchange, Rosaleen accidentally injures the huntsman with his own rifle. The hunter contorts in pain and turns back into a wolf. Rosaleen apologizes and takes pity on the wounded beast, musing that his pack could leave him behind in his state. She sits down and begins petting the wolf, comforting him while telling him a story.

The villagers later arrive at the cottage, looking for a werewolf within. Instead, they discover that Rosaleen herself has become a wolf. Together, she and the huntsman escape to the forest, joined by a growing pack. The wolves seem to stream into the real world, breaking into Rosaleen's house and gathering outside her bedroom. Rosaleen awakes with a scream as one leaps in through the window and sends her toys crashing to the floor, symbolizing the end of her childhood innocence.

=== Embedded stories ===
Stories are woven through the film, tales told within the main narrative that overlap with the central plot.

- Granny's tale to Rosaleen: A young groom whose eyebrows meet is about to bed his new bride when a "call of nature" summons him outside. He disappears and his bride is terrified to see wolves howling outside. A search the following day yields a wolf pawprint only, and no sign of the groom; the bride furiously curses the wolves for taking away the man she loved. Years later, having since remarried and started a family, she is shocked to find her first husband at the door. Enraged at her having children with a new husband, the groom transforms into a werewolf, but is killed when the new husband returns.
- Granny's second tale to Rosaleen: A young man whose eyebrows meet, the bastard son of a priest, is walking through the enchanted forest when he encounters the Devil, anachronistically arriving in a Rolls-Royce chauffeured by a blonde-haired woman. The Devil offers the boy a transformative potion, which he rubs onto his chest, causing hair to sprout rapidly. The boy is pleased, but then vines grow from the ground, twining around his legs and trapping him. He wails in protest and fear, his face distorting with his cries. His anguished visage appears in Rosaleen's bedroom mirror at the end of that dream sequence.
- Rosaleen's story to her mother: A woman who lived in a valley "done a terrible wrong" by a rich, young nobleman turns up visibly pregnant at his wedding party "to put wrong to right". She calls out the nobleman and the rest of the nobles for their bigoted actions, and further denounces them by declaring "The wolves in the forest are more decent". She then reveals that she is an enchantress and magically transforms the groom, the bride, and all the other nobles (except for the musicians and servants) into wolves. They flee into the forest as the enchantress laughs and exchanges a respectful bow with the servants. Afterward, the enchantress commands that the wolves "serenade" her and her child with their howling each night.
- Rosaleen's story to the huntsman/wolf: A she-wolf from the world beneath arrives at a village. Despite meaning no harm, she is shot at and injured by a villager. She reveals herself in her human form to a sagely priest who takes her in and bandages her wound, seeing her innocence. Although touched by the priest's compassion and actions, she feels that she is not fit to stay. After recovering enough, she eventually returns to her world through the village well.

== Cast ==
- Sarah Patterson as Rosaleen
- Angela Lansbury as Granny
- David Warner as Father
- Tusse Silberg as Mother
- Micha Bergese as Huntsman (his first role in a feature film)
- Brian Glover as Amorous Boy's father
- Graham Crowden as Old Priest
- Kathryn Pogson as Young Bride
- Stephen Rea as Young Groom
- Georgia Slowe as Alice, Girl Killed by Wolves
- Susan Porrett as Amorous Boy's mother
- Shane Johnstone as Amorous Boy
- Dawn Archibald as Witch Woman
- Richard Morant as Wealthy Groom
- Danielle Dax as Wolfgirl (a non-speaking role)
- Jim Carter as Second Husband (uncredited)
- Terence Stamp as The Devil (uncredited)

== Production ==
=== Writing ===
Carter had previously adapted the story for a 1980 radio dramatization. She collaborated with director Neil Jordan on the film script, her first experience writing for the screen. Jordan had previously directed only one feature film. The two met in Dublin in 1982 to discuss expanding Carter's radio drama, which Jordan called "too short for a feature film".

In an L.A. Weekly interview published to correspond with the film's US debut, Jordan said: "In a normal film you have a story with different movements that program, develop, go a little bit off the trunk, come back, and end. In this film, the different movements of the plot are actually separate stories. You start with an introduction and then move into different stories that relate to the main theme, all building to the fairy tale that everybody knows. The opening element of the dreamer gave us the freedom to move from story to story."

The script reached its third draft by July 1983. Carter's original screenplay of The Company of Wolves (as posthumously published in the 1996 anthology The Curious Room) featured an additional story being told by the huntsman, a very different final tale by Rosaleen (reminiscent of Carter's "Peter and the Wolf" from her collection Black Venus), and a scene set in a church with an animal congregation.

Jordan notes how Carter was "thrilled with the process" of making a film, as she "had never really been involved with one." After the film, Jordan and Carter looked for other projects which they could work on together. However, no others came to fruition, partly because of Carter's later illness. According to Jordan, he and Carter discussed a possible adaptation of Vampirella, Carter's radio play which served as the original version of her short story "The Lady of the House of Love" from The Bloody Chamber.

The budget was provided by ITC Distributors.

=== Principal photography ===
The Company of Wolves was filmed in Shepperton Studios in England. The film's cast was primarily made up of British actors. Sarah Patterson made her screen debut, despite being much younger than the kind of actress the casting director had been looking for, and likely too young to understand some of the film's more adult concepts. Her youth also meant having to make special arrangements with her school in order for her to be away for nine weeks while shooting took place. Northern Irish actor Stephen Rea had already worked with director Neil Jordan in Angel and would later work with him again in The Crying Game, Interview with the Vampire and Breakfast on Pluto, amongst others.

=== Set design and visuals ===
Jordan worked for several weeks in pre-production with artist filmmakers Nichola Bruce and Michael Coulson to create hundreds of detailed storyboard drawings. Also involved with production was production designer Anton Furst and his draftsman Nigel Phelps, who would later go on to work on Tim Burton's Batman. The costumes were designed by Elizabeth Waller, an experienced designer who had worked on BBC period drama and fantasy films. The film's visuals were of particular importance, as Jordan explains:

The visual design was an integral part of the script. It was written and imagined with a heightened sense of reality in mind.

In the DVD commentary, Jordan notes the difficulty of having to create the look of the film on a limited budget, having to create a fairytale forest out of essentially "twelve trees". He nevertheless succeeded in creating a sunless, mystical, wondrous and claustrophobic setting saturated with fantastic elements and symbols. Jordan recalls;

I was retrying to eroticize this forest and he (Furst) knew exactly what I was talking about. We built this set at Shepperton that had these vaginal propensities to them (Laughs). We looked at a painter called Samuel Palmer. If you want to eroticize landscape, look at his paintings, they're beautiful. It was all about sensuality and beauty, really, but one was very aware that at the heart of it, is a cautionary tale, and bloody dark stuff going on.

=== Use of dogs ===
The script calls for a great number of wolves to appear. Due to budgetary constraints and other factors such as cast safety, most of the 'wolves' shown in the film are, in fact, evidently Belgian Shepherd Dogs, mainly Tervuerens and Groenendaels, whose fur was specially dyed. In the DVD commentary for the film, Jordan notes the bravery of young star Sarah Patterson when acting amongst the genuine wolves. Using particular light angles, the eyes of both real and "shepherd" wolves are made to glow dramatically in the film.

=== Ending ===
On the ending, Jordan was not satisfied with the final scene. Carter's first ending for the film would have featured Rosaleen diving into the floor of her bedroom and being swallowed up as by water. Jordan claimed that the limited technology of the time prevented the production of such a sequence, whereas later computer-generated imagery effects would in fact make it quite simple.

" The only thing I was not happy with in that movie was the ending. That's where the limitations of the budget came. The theme of the movie is a young girl's discovery of her own power, so to end it with her screaming was not enough. What we had written was her waking from this strange dream in her bedroom, standing up on the bed and diving into the floor. The floor is like a pool of water. She vanishes and this floor kind of ripples and goes back to wood again. I just didn't know how to realize it. I think the ending now blunts the film as a whole."

== Release ==
The film received its world premiere at the Toronto International Film Festival in Canada on 15 September 1984. It was released in the United Kingdom on 21 September and was released in the United States on 19 April 1985 where it was shown in 995 theatres. At its London Premiere, Sarah Patterson was refused admission because of its 18 rating certificate and being a minor.

=== Distribution ===
The film was distributed in the United States by Cannon Films. Jordan notes that Cannon pushed the concept of the film as primarily a horror film. Jordan maintains that it is not a horror film and that such a label might actually be misleading to audiences.

=== Home media ===
The film was later released on VHS in numerous countries. A Region 1 DVD release came several years later on 15 October 2002. A Region 2 special edition version of the film was released on 17 October 2005, approximately 20 years after the film's initial release in theatres. This special edition came in a metal case and included an audio commentary by director Neil Jordan, stills galleries, the film's theatrical trailer and a printed "Behind the Scenes Dossier". This special edition version was also released on Universal Media Disc for the Sony PlayStation Portable on 30 January 2006. The film was released on Blu-ray in 2007 in United Kingdom by ITV.

== Reception ==
=== Critical response ===
On Rotten Tomatoes, the film holds an approval rating of 86% based on 21 reviews, with a weighted average rating of 6.8/10. Metacritic, which uses a weighted average, assigned the film a score of 69 out of 100, based on 14 critics, indicating "generally favorable" reviews.

Colin Greenland reviewed The Company of Wolves for Imagine magazine, and stated that "It's a Freudian fairytale with deliciously gruesome transformation scenes and deep, vigorous imagery, but not without twee patches."

In April 1985, upon the film's US debut, Roger Ebert gave the film three stars out of four, and called it a "disturbing and stylish attempt to collect some of the nightmares that lie beneath the surface of "'Little Red Riding Hood'".

Reactions among academic feminist critics were divided. Maggie Anwell decried The Company of Wolves for what she perceived as an over-emphasis on bloody werewolf special effects, while Charlotte Crofts argued the film is a sensitive adaptation of Carter's reworking of Charles Perrault's Little Red Riding Hood fairy tale.

In 2010 Louise Watson, writing for BFI Screenonline, said Neil Jordan "evokes an eerie, dreamlike atmosphere for the film's heightened reality. Its otherworldly scenery and costumes seem to have been inspired by fairytale illustrations, mixed with the studio-bound visual style of Hammer horror. The Hammer-like theatrical forest creates a sense of brooding claustrophobia where no sunlight can reach, accentuating Rosaleen's trapped existence. An intensely visual film, teeming with rich symbolism and imagery... settings and special effects dominate the film, often at the expense of the (perhaps deliberately) underdeveloped characters."

=== Box office ===
Financially, the film only just broke even on its opening weekend in the US, having been made for approximately $2 million and taking $2,234,776 in 995 theatres. However, in total, the film took over $4 million in the US.

It made £1,629,000 in the UK.

=== Awards and nominations ===
The film won the awards for Best Film and Best Special Effects at the 1985 International Fantasy Film Awards and was nominated for four BAFTA Awards for Costume Design, Make Up, Production Design/Art Direction, and Special Visual Effects.

Won

- Special Mention at the 1985 Fantafestival
- Three 1985 Fantasporto awards:
  - Audience Jury Award
  - Critics' Award
  - 1985 International Fantasy Film Award (Best Film and Best Special Effects)
- 1985 London Critics Circle Film Awards ALFS Award (Director of the Year: Neil Jordan)
- Two 1985 Sitges - Catalan International Film Festival awards:
  - Caixa de Catalunya (Best Film and Best Special Effects)
  - Prize of the International Critics' Jury

Nominated

- Grand Prize at the Avoriaz Fantastic Film Festival, 1985.
- Four 1985 BAFTA Awards:
  - Best Costume Design (Elizabeth Waller)
  - Best Make Up Artist (Jane Royle, Christopher Tucker)
  - Best Production Design/Art Direction (Anton Furst)
  - Best Special Visual Effects (Christopher Tucker, Alan Whibley).

== Soundtrack ==
A soundtrack album, featuring the George Fenton score from the film, was released in 1985 on Varèse Sarabande Records.

Track listing:

Side A:

1. "The Message And Main Theme"
2. "Rosaleen's First Dream"
3. "The Story Of The Bride And Groom: The Village Wedding/The Return Of The Groom"
4. "The Forest And The Huntsman's Theme"
5. "The Wedding Party"

Side B:

1. "The Boy And The Devil"
2. "One Sunday Afternoon"
3. "All The Better To Eat You With: Arriving At Granny's Cottage/The Promise And Transformation"
4. "The Wolfgirl"
5. "Liberation"

The soundtrack was later released on CD on That's Entertainment Records in the UK and Ireland in 1990 and then on Jay Records on CD in Europe in 2000.

== See also ==
- Valerie and Her Week of Wonders, a 1970 Czech surrealist film which also features a young girl who experiences a series of beautiful and perilous dreams inspired by her menarche.
- Ginger Snaps, a 2000 Canadian film which also uses lycanthropy as a metaphor for an adolescent girl's burgeoning sexuality.
- Red Riding Hood, Catherine Hardwicke's 2011 film which also replaces a werewolf for the wolf, and is a coming-of-age story about adolescence and sexual awakening.
