= David Wheatley (director) =

British film director (1949–2009)

David Rogerson Wheatley
- Born: 20 December 1949; Sunderland
- Died: 5 April 2009 (aged 59)
- Occupations: Film and television director

David Rogerson Wheatley (20 December 1949 – 5 April 2009) was a British film and television director.

His Royal College of Art graduation film was on the Belgian surrealist artist René Magritte, after his tutor Gavin Millar showed him a book on the artist. The film was screened as part of the BBC's arts' programmes Omnibus in 1979. From that year, he contributed films to the Omnibus and Arena series, before branching out into other areas in the mid 1980s.

He directed The Magic Toyshop (1987), a fantasy film based on the Angela Carter novel, which Carter adapted herself, and several social dramas set in the north of England. In the early 1990s he directed a series of Catherine Cookson adaptations for Tyne Tees which gained audiences of 14 million. He also directed episodes of Fat Friends and Dalziel and Pascoe.

Wheatley was married to Melanie Pringle for 10 years, and they had a son, Alexander. Later, he was in a relationship with film editor Camilla Tress, and they had a daughter, Francesca. He died after a long illness on 5 April 2009, aged 59.

== See also ==
- The March (1990 film), a film directed by David Wheatley
