= Angela Carter =

English novelist (1940–1992)

- Born: Angela Olive Stalker; 7 May 1940; Eastbourne, England
- Died: 16 February 1992 (aged 51); London, England
- Education: University of Bristol
- Occupations: Novelist, short story writer, poet, journalist
- Spouses: Paul Carter (m. 1960; div. 1972) Mark Pearce (m. 1991)
- Children: 1
- Writing career
- Genres: Magical realism, picaresque
- Website: www.angelacarter.co.uk

Angela Olive Pearce (formerly Carter, née Stalker; 7 May 1940 – 16 February 1992), who published under the name Angela Carter, was an English novelist, short story writer, poet, and journalist, known for her feminist, magical realist, and picaresque works. In 1984, her short story "The Company of Wolves" was adapted into a film of the same name. In 2008, The Times ranked Carter tenth in their list of "The 50 greatest British writers since 1945". In 2012, Nights at the Circus was selected as the best ever winner of the James Tait Black Memorial Prize.

== Biography ==
Born Angela Olive Stalker in Eastbourne, in 1940, to Sophia Olive (née Farthing; 1905–1969), a cashier at Selfridge's, and journalist Hugh Alexander Stalker (1896–1988), Carter was evacuated as a child to live in Yorkshire with her maternal grandmother.

As a child, Carter was overprotected and indulged. Her mother would use her ration vouchers to buy her treats, leading to her becoming extremely overweight. At the age of eleven, she was still not allowed to go to the lavatory alone, and was forced to wash with the bathroom door open. At 17, she began to lose weight, dressing provocatively and taking up swearing and smoking, leading to a rift with her parents. She also developed anorexia.

After attending Streatham and Clapham High School, in south London, she began work as a journalist on The Croydon Advertiser, following in her father's footsteps. Carter attended the University of Bristol where she studied English literature.

She married twice, first in 1960 to Paul Carter, ultimately divorcing in 1972. In 1969, she used the proceeds of her Somerset Maugham Award to leave her husband and relocate for two years to Tokyo, where, she claims in Nothing Sacred (1982), that she "learnt what it is to be a woman and became radicalised". She wrote about her experiences there in articles for New Society and in a collection of short stories, Fireworks: Nine Profane Pieces (1974). Evidence of her experiences in Japan can also be seen in The Infernal Desire Machines of Doctor Hoffman (1972).

She then explored the United States, Asia, and Europe, helped by her fluency in French and German. She spent much of the late 1970s and 1980s as a writer-in-residence at universities, including the University of Sheffield, Brown University, the University of Adelaide, and the University of East Anglia. In 1977, Carter met Mark Pearce, with whom she had one son and whom she eventually married in May 1991 shortly before her death in 1992. The couple had one son, Alexander Pearce, born in 1982 or 1983.

In 1979, both The Bloody Chamber, and her feminist essay The Sadeian Woman and the Ideology of Pornography were published. In The Bloody Chamber, she rewrote traditional fairy tales so as to subvert their essentializing tendencies. In her 1985 interview with Helen Cagney, Carter said, “So, I suppose that what interests me is the way these fairy tales and folklore are methods of making sense of events and certain occurrences in a particular way.” Sarah Gamble, therefore, argued that Carter’s book is a manifestation of her materialism, that is, “her desire to bring fairy tale back down to earth in order to demonstrate how it could be used to explore the real conditions of everyday life". In The Sadeian Woman, according to the writer Marina Warner, Carter "deconstructs the arguments that underlie The Bloody Chamber. It's about desire and its destruction, the self-immolation of women, how women collude and connive with their condition of enslavement. She was much more independent-minded than the traditional feminist of her time."

As well as being a prolific writer of fiction, Carter contributed many articles to The Guardian, The Independent and New Statesman, collected in Shaking a Leg. She adapted a number of her short stories for radio and wrote two original radio dramas on Richard Dadd and Ronald Firbank. Two of her works of fiction have been adapted for film: The Company of Wolves (1984) and The Magic Toyshop (1967). She was actively involved in both adaptations; her screenplays were subsequently published in The Curious Room, a collection of her dramatic writings, including radio scripts and a libretto for an opera based on Virginia Woolf's Orlando. Carter's novel Nights at the Circus won the 1984 James Tait Black Memorial Prize for literature. Her 1991 novel Wise Children offers a surreal ride through British theatre and music hall traditions.

Carter died aged 51 in 1992 at her home in London after developing lung cancer. At the time of her death, she had started work on a sequel to Charlotte Brontë's Jane Eyre based on the later life of Jane's stepdaughter, Adèle Varens; only a synopsis survives.

== Works ==
=== Novels ===
- Shadow Dance (1966, also known as Honeybuzzard)
- The Magic Toyshop (1967)
- Several Perceptions (1968)
- Heroes and Villains (1969)
- Love (1971)
- The Infernal Desire Machines of Doctor Hoffman (1972, also known as The War of Dreams)
- The Passion of New Eve (1977)
- Nights at the Circus (1984)
- Wise Children (1991)

=== Short fiction collections ===
- Fireworks: Nine Profane Pieces (1974; also published as Fireworks: Nine Stories in Various Disguises and Fireworks)
- The Bloody Chamber (1979)
- "The Bridegroom" (1983) (Uncollected short story)
- Black Venus (1985; published as Saints and Strangers in the United States)
- American Ghosts and Old World Wonders (1993)
- Burning Your Boats (1995)

=== Poetry collections ===
- Five Quiet Shouters (1966)
- Unicorn (1966)
- Unicorn: The Poetry of Angela Carter (2015)

=== Dramatic works ===
- Come Unto These Yellow Sands: Four Radio Plays (1985)
- The Curious Room: Plays, Film Scripts and an Opera (1996) (includes Carter's screenplays for adaptations of The Company of Wolves and The Magic Toyshop; also includes the contents of Come Unto These Golden Sands: Four Radio Plays)

=== Children's books ===
- The Donkey Prince (1970, illustrated by Eros Keith)
- Miss Z, the Dark Young Lady (1970, illustrated by Eros Keith)
- Comic and Curious Cats (1979, illustrated by Martin Leman)
- Moonshadow (1982) illustrated by Justin Todd
- Sea-Cat and Dragon King (2000, illustrated by Eva Tatcheva)

=== Non-fiction ===
- The Sadeian Woman and the Ideology of Pornography (1979)
- Nothing Sacred: Selected Writings (1982)
- Expletives Deleted: Selected Writings (1992)
- Shaking a Leg: Collected Journalism and Writing (1997)

She wrote two entries in "A Hundred Things Japanese" published in 1975 by the Japan Culture Institute. ISBN 0-87040-364-8 It says "She has lived in Japan both from 1969 to 1971 and also during 1974" (p. 202).

=== As editor ===
- Wayward Girls and Wicked Women: An Anthology of Subversive Stories (1986)
- The Virago Book of Fairy Tales (1990) a.k.a. The Old Wives' Fairy Tale Book
- The Second Virago Book of Fairy Tales (1992) a.k.a. Strange Things Sometimes Still Happen: Fairy Tales From Around the World (1993)
- Angela Carter's Book of Fairy Tales (2005) (collects the two books above)

=== As translator ===
- The Fairy Tales of Charles Perrault (1977)
- Sleeping Beauty and Other Favourite Fairy Tales (1982) illustrated by Michael Foreman (Perrault stories with two by Leprince de Beaumont)

=== Film adaptations ===
- The Company of Wolves (1984) adapted by Carter with Neil Jordan from her short story of the same name, "Wolf-Alice" and "The Werewolf"
- The Magic Toyshop (1987) adapted by Carter from her novel of the same name, and directed by David Wheatley

=== Radio plays ===
- Vampirella (1976) written by Carter and directed by Glyn Dearman for BBC. Formed the basis for the short story "The Lady of the House of Love".
- Come Unto These Yellow Sands (1979)
- The Company of Wolves (1980) adapted by Carter from her short story of the same name, and directed by Glyn Dearman for BBC
- Puss-in-Boots (1982) adapted by Carter from her short story and directed by Glyn Dearman for BBC
- A Self-Made Man (1984)

=== Television ===
- The Holy Family Album (1991)
- Omnibus: Angela Carter's Curious Room (1992)

== Analysis and critique ==
- Acocella, Joan (13 March 2017). "Metamorphoses : how Angela Carter became feminism's great mythologist". The Critics. Books. The New Yorker. Vol. 93, no. 4. pp. 71–76. Published online as "Angela Carter's feminist mythology".
- Crofts, Charlotte, "Curiously downbeat hybrid" or "radical retelling"? – Neil Jordan's and Angela Carter's The Company of Wolves. In Cartmell, Deborah, I. Q. Hunter, Heidi Kaye and Imelda Whelehan (eds), Sisterhoods Across the Literature Media Divide, London: Pluto Press, 1998, pp. 48–63.]
- Crofts, Charlotte, Anagrams of Desire: Angela Carter's Writing for Radio, Film and Television. Manchester: Manchester University Press, 2003.
- Crofts, Charlotte, ‘The Other of the Other’: Angela Carter's ‘New-Fangled’ Orientalism. In Munford, Rebecca Re-Visiting Angela Carter Texts, Contexts, Intertexts. London & New York: Palgrave Macmillan, 2006, pp. 87–109.
- Dimovitz, Scott A., Angela Carter: Surrealist, Psychologist, Moral Pornographer. New York: Routledge, 2016.
- Dimovitz, Scott A. "I Was the Subject of the Sentence Written on the Mirror: Angela Carter's Short Fiction and the Unwriting of the Psychoanalytic Subject". Lit: Literature Interpretation Theory 21.1 (2010): 1–19.
- Dimovitz, Scott A., "Angela Carter's Narrative Chiasmus: The Infernal Desire Machines of Doctor Hoffman and The Passion of New Eve". Genre XVII (2009): 83–111.
- Dimovitz, Scott A., "Cartesian Nuts: Rewriting the Platonic Androgyne in Angela Carter's Japanese Surrealism". FEMSPEC: An Interdisciplinary Feminist Journal, 6:2 (December 2005): 15–31.
- Dmytriieva, Valeriia V., "Gender Alterations in English and French Modernist 'Bluebeard' Fairytale". English Language and literature studies, 6:3. (2016): 16–20.
- Enright, Anne (17 February 2011). "Diary". London Review of Books. 33 (4): 38–39.
- Gordon, Edmund, The Invention of Angela Carter: A Biography. London: Chatto & Windus, 2016.
- Kérchy, Anna, Body-Texts in the Novels of Angela Carter. Writing from a Corporeagraphic Perspective. Lewiston, New York: Edwin Mellen Press, 2008.
- Milne, Andrew, The Bloody Chamber d'Angela Carter, Paris: Editions Le Manuscrit, Université, 2006.
- Milne, Andrew, Angela Carter's The Bloody Chamber: A Reader's Guide, Paris: Editions Le Manuscrit Université, 2007.
- Munford, Rebecca (ed.), Re-Visiting Angela Carter Texts, Contexts, Intertexts. London & New York: Palgrave Macmillan, 2006.
- Tonkin, Maggie, Angela Carter and Decadence: Critical Fictions/Fictional Critiques. Basingstoke: Palgrave Macmillan, 2012.
- Topping, Angela, Focus on The Bloody Chamber and Other Stories. London: The Greenwich Exchange, 2009.
- Wisker, Gina. "At Home all was Blood and Feathers: The Werewolf in the Kitchen - Angela Carter and Horror". In Clive Bloom (ed), Creepers: British Horror and Fantasy in the Twentieth Century. London and Boulder CO: Pluto Press, 1993, pp. 161–75.

== Commemoration ==
English Heritage unveiled a blue plaque at Carter's final home at 107, The Chase in Clapham, South London in September 2019. She wrote many of her books in the sixteen years she lived at the address, as well as tutoring the young Kazuo Ishiguro.

The British Library acquired the Angela Carter Papers in 2008, a large collection of 224 files and volumes containing manuscripts, correspondence, personal diaries, photographs, and audio cassettes.

Angela Carter Close in Brixton is named after her.

== In popular culture ==
The English rock band Wolf Alice takes its name from the short story of the same title, published in The Bloody Chamber, which founder Ellie Rowsell supposedly stole from her school library. Another English band, The New Eves, is named for The Passion of New Eve, which band members Kate Mager and Ella Russell were studying when they met at university.
