= Black Venus (short story collection) =

1985 short story collection by Angela Carter

- Hardback edition cover
- Author: Angela Carter
- Original title: Saints and Strangers
- Language: English
- Genre: Anthology
- Published: 1985 by Chatto & Windus
- Publication place: United Kingdom
- Media type: Print
- Pages: 121 pp
- ISBN: 978-0-7011-3964-3
- OCLC: 15631047

Black Venus (also published as Saints and Strangers) is a collection of short fiction by Angela Carter. It was first published in the United Kingdom in 1985 by Chatto & Windus Ltd. and contains eight stories, the majority of which are concerned with re-imagining the lives of certain figures in history, with a particular emphasis on some well known through literature.

The "Black Venus" of the title story is Jeanne Duval, the lover of poet Charles Baudelaire. The anthology's contents are also reprinted in the volume Burning Your Boats, which features all of Carter's short fiction.

== Contents ==
1. “Black Venus”
2. “The Kiss”
3. “Our Lady of the Massacre”
4. “The Cabinet of Edgar Allan Poe”
5. “Overture and Incidental Music for A Midsummer Night's Dream”
6. “Peter and the Wolf”
7. “The Kitchen Child”
8. “The Fall River Axe Murders”
