= The Bloody Chamber =

Collection of short stories by Angela Carter

- First edition
- Author: Angela Carter
- Cover artist: Malcolm Ashman
- Language: English
- Genre: Magical realism, short story collection
- Publisher: Gollancz (UK); Harper & Row (US)
- Publication date: 1979
- Publication place: United Kingdom
- Media type: Print (Paperback)
- ISBN: 0-09-958811-0 (ISBN 978-0-09-958811-5 from January 2007)
- OCLC: 409990414

The Bloody Chamber (or The Bloody Chamber and Other Stories) is a collection of short stories by English writer Angela Carter. It was first published in the United Kingdom in 1979 by Gollancz and won the Cheltenham Festival Literary Prize. The stories are all based on fairytales or folk tales. However, Carter stated:

My intention was not to do 'versions' or, as the American edition of the book said, horribly, 'adult' fairy tales, but to extract the latent content from the traditional stories.

The collection contains ten stories: "The Bloody Chamber", "The Courtship of Mr Lyon", "The Tiger's Bride", "Puss-in-Boots", "The Erl-King", "The Snow Child", "The Lady of the House of Love", "The Werewolf", "The Company of Wolves" and "Wolf-Alice".

The tales vary greatly in length, with the novelette "The Bloody Chamber" being "more than twice the length of any of the other stories, and more than thirty times the length of the shortest [the vignette "The Snow Child"]."

The collection's contents are also reprinted in Carter's Burning Your Boats.

== Story summaries ==
The stories within The Bloody Chamber are explicitly based on fairy tales. Carter may have been inspired by the works of author and fairytale collector Charles Perrault, whose fairy tales she had translated shortly beforehand.

=== The Bloody Chamber ===
(Based on "Bluebeard".)

The narrator, a beautiful teenage girl, marries an older, wealthy French Marquis, who met her while she was playing the piano at a tea-party. Her governess, though pleased she has made a good match, notes the Marquis has formerly wed three women, all of whom died under mysterious circumstances. He gifts his bride a choker made of rubies, warning her against taking it off, and takes her to his coastal castle in Brittany, where she discovers his collection of pornographic engravings and paintings. He takes pleasure in her embarrassment, and they consummate their marriage that night, in a bedroom filled with white lilies and mirrors. The following morning, he hears of urgent business he must attend to in New York. When he leaves, he entrusts her with a chain of keys, telling her she can use them to go about the castle as she wishes. He forbids her from using a certain key, telling her it opens his private den. She tries to grow accustomed to her new-found decadence, but, being a talented pianist, feels most comfortable with the blind piano-tuner. Closer to her age, he lives in a nearby town and, after tuning the piano her husband gave to her as a wedding present, asks to hear her play once in a while. But still, her husband's absence makes her feel melancholy, and she telephones her mother. Afterwards, she starts going through the Marquis' things in order to learn more about him. After going through his desk, she learns more of his previous wives, which pushes her to take the forbidden key and enter his chamber. She soon realizes the full extent of his perverse and murderous tendencies when she discovers the bodies of his previous wives, presented in gruesome ways, some of which are surrounded by the same white lilies the Marquis filled her own room with. In her shock, she drops the key, staining it with the blood on the floor. When she meets the piano-tuner again, she confides the newly discovered secret to him. Before the two can flee, the Marquis returns home, his business trip having been cut short. Unable to clean the blood from the key, the Marquis discovers that she has entered the bloody chamber and presses the key into her forehead, leaving a red mark. He decides to kill her by execution upon a chopping block. The brave piano tuner is willing to stay and accompany her even though he knows he will not be able to save her. She is saved at the last moment at the end of the story by her mother, who bursts into the castle and shoots the Marquis just as he is about to behead the girl in the courtyard. The girl, her mother, and the piano tuner go on to live together and the young widow opens a little music school on the outskirts of Paris. Most of the money she inherited is given away to various charities and the castle is turned into a school for the blind. However, the girl is still stained with a red mark on her forehead with the key.

=== The Courtship of Mr Lyon ===
(Based on Beauty and the Beast – the concept of the Beast as a lion-like figure is a popular one, most notably in the French film version of 1946.)

Beauty's father, after experiencing car trouble, takes advantage of a stranger's hospitality. However, his benefactor – the Beast – takes umbrage when he steals a miraculous white rose for his beloved daughter. Beauty becomes the guest of the leonine Beast, and the Beast aids her father in getting his fortune back. Beauty later joins her father in London, where she almost forgets the Beast, causing him to wither away from heartache. When Beauty learns that he is dying, she returns, saving him. Beauty and the Beast disclose their love for one another and the Beast's humanity is revealed. They live happily ever after.

=== The Tiger's Bride ===
(Also based on Beauty and the Beast. )

A woman moves in with a mysterious, masked "Milord", the Beast, after her father loses her to him in a game of cards. Milord is eventually revealed to be a tiger. In a reversal of the ending of "The Courtship of Mr Lyon", the heroine transforms at the end into a glorious tigress who is the proper mate to the Beast, who will from now on be true to his own nature and not disguise himself as a human. The story has similarities to the Indian story The Brahman Girl That Married a Tiger as well as ending elements of The Frog Prince.

=== Puss-in-Boots ===
(Based on "Puss in Boots" and similar to The Barber of Seville.)

Figaro, a cat, moves in with a rakish young man who lives a happily debauched life. They live a carefree existence, with the cat helping him to make money by cheating at cards, until the young man actually falls in love (to the cat's disgust) with a young woman kept in a tower by a miserly, older husband who treats her only as property. The cat, hoping his friend will tire of the woman if he has her, helps the young man into the bed of his sweetheart by playing tricks on the old husband and the young woman's keeper. Figaro himself finds love with the young woman's cat, a tabby, and the two cats arrange the fortunes of both themselves and the young man and woman by arranging to trip the old man so that he will fall to his death.

Angela Carter had described Puss in Boots as "the Cat as Con Man... a masterpiece of cynicism... a Figaroesque valet – a servant so much the master already".

=== The Erl-King ===
(An adaptation of the Erlking in folklore; a sort of goblin or spirit of the woodlands.)

A maiden wanders into the woods and is seduced by the sinister Erl-King, a seeming personification of the forest itself. However, she eventually realises that he plans to imprison her by turning her into a bird, which he has done with other girls. Realising the Erl-King's plan, she kills him by strangling him with his own hair, thus keeping her freedom.

=== The Snow Child ===
(Has roots in various folktales, most apparently The Snow-child; The Snow, the Crow, and the Blood; and also tales such as Snegurochka and an obscure variant of Snow White.)

A Count and Countess go riding in midwinter. The Count sees snow on the ground and wishes for a child "as white as snow". Similar wishes are made when the Count sees a hole in the snow containing a pool of blood, and a raven. As soon as he made his final wish a young woman of the exact description appears at the side of the road. The Count pays immediate attention to her, much to the chagrin of the Countess. At the Countess' command, the girl picks a rose but is pricked by a thorn and dies, after which the Count rapes her corpse. After this, her cadaver melts into the snow, leaving nothing but a bloodstain on the snow, a black feather and the rose that she had picked.

=== The Lady of the House of Love ===
(Loosely based on "Sleeping Beauty", and more directly on a radio play by Carter, called "Vampirella".)

A virginal English soldier, travelling through Romania by bicycle, finds himself in a deserted village. He comes across a mansion inhabited by a vampire who survives by enticing young men into her bedroom and feeding on them. She intends to feed on the young soldier but his purity and virginity have a curious effect on her. When they enter her bedroom she accidentally cuts herself and the soldier kisses it better. He wakes up to find her dead. He leaves to return to his battalion due to the outbreak of World War I.

=== The Werewolf ===
(Based on "Little Red Riding Hood".)

A girl goes to visit her grandmother, but encounters a werewolf on the way, whose paw she cuts off with a knife. When she reaches her grandmother's house, the paw has turned into a hand with the grandmother's ring on it, and the grandmother is both delirious and missing her hand. This reveals the girl's grandmother as the werewolf, and she is stoned to death. The girl then inherits all of her grandmother's possessions.

=== The Company of Wolves ===
(Loose adaptation of "Little Red Riding Hood".)

"Those are the voices of my brothers, darling; I love the company of wolves."

In the beginning of the piece, the wolf is described as an evil thing. One mini story in the beginning is about a witch who gets impregnated and left by a nobleman, who then visits his wedding and turns the whole wedding ceremony into wolves. She makes the wolves come to serenade her and the baby. In another mini story a young lady and a man are about to consummate their wedding night. As they get ready the husband says he needs to stop and relieve himself in the forest. The wife waits and he never returns. Off in the distance a wolf can be heard howling. She then concludes her husband will never return and marries a new man. With her new husband she bears children. Her first husband comes back and sees his wife. He then becomes furious, transforms into a wolf and bites the leg off the eldest child. Her second husband kills the wolf, who dies and looks exactly the same as he had when he disappeared; this makes her cry and her husband beats her. Later we meet a young girl walking in the woods who is "loved by everyone" and "[fears] nothing", who meets a handsome hunter who makes a deal with her; whoever can get to the grandmother's house first wins, and if the hunter wins she owes him a kiss. The protagonist lets the hunter win because she wants to kiss him. The hunter arrives at the protagonist's grandmother's house first, as planned, but tricks the woman to let him in. She is frail and sick, and holds a Bible in her hand to protect herself against any harm. The hunter is revealed to be a wolf and eats the grandmother, then waits for the girl. When she arrives, she notices her grandmother's hair in the fire and knows the wolf has killed her. He threatens to kill and eat her too, but she laughs in his face and proceeds to seduce him, stripping off their clothes and throwing them into the fire. The last lines are "See! sweet and sound she sleeps in granny's bed, between the paws of the tender wolf."

=== Wolf-Alice ===
(Based on an obscure variant of "Little Red Riding Hood" and with reference to Through the Looking-Glass, and What Alice Found There, this tale explores the journey towards subjectivity and self-awareness from the perspective of a feral child.)

A feral child, whom some nuns have attempted to "civilise" by trying to teach her standard social graces, is left in the house of a monstrous, vampiric Duke when she cannot conform. She gradually comes to realise her own identity as a young woman and human being, and even develops compassion for the Duke, going far beyond the nuns' stunted views of life.

== Publication history ==
The Bloody Chamber was first published in 1979, though many of the stories within the collection are reprints from other sources, such as magazines, radio and other collections. Only two are completely original to this collection, though many were revised or changed slightly from their previously published versions for this collection.

The stories' various origins are listed below

- "The Bloody Chamber" made its début in The Bloody Chamber.
- "The Courtship of Mr Lyon" originally appeared in the British version of Vogue. It was revised for this collection.
- "The Tiger's Bride" made its début in The Bloody Chamber.
- "Puss-in-Boots" was intended for a 1979 anthology The Straw and the Gold, edited by Emma Tennant, but the anthology was never published.
- "The Erl-King" originally appeared in Bananas. It was revised for this collection.
- "The Snow Child" was originally broadcast on the BBC Radio 4 programme Not Now, I'm Listening. It was revised for this collection.
- "The Lady of the House of Love" originally appeared in print in The Iowa Review. However, it was originally written as a radio play entitled Vampirella which was broadcast on BBC Radio 3 in 1976. The story was revised from the previous printed version for this collection.
- "The Werewolf" originally appeared in South-West Arts Review. It was revised for this collection.
- "The Company of Wolves" originally appeared in Bananas. It was revised for this collection.
- "Wolf-Alice" originally appeared in Stand. It was revised for this collection.

== Style and themes ==
The Bloody Chamber can be treated as a collection of short stories that speak to a bigger narrative that deals with issues of feminism and metamorphosis instead of a set of individual tales. Although each particular narrative deals with a different set of characters, the 'oppressed female seeking liberation' is a common theme and concept that is explored throughout the collection. The characters seem to blend into each other and become indistinguishable from one another when recognising this theme in the text.

In particular to Carter's writing style, Margaret Atwood states that Carter presents a "macabre" painting, filled with gruesome and melancholy prose. "Not for her Hemingway's clean, well-lighted place, or Orwell's clear prose like a pane of glass. She prefers instead a dirty, badly-lit place, with gnawed bones in the corner and dusty mirrors you'd best not consult." It shows throughout these short stories, Carter's dedication to dark towers and dusky landscapes. Carter herself admits to being a fan of both Gothic horror and Edgar Allan Poe in particular, including in her stories such elements as incest and cannibalism in order to call upon the Gothic tradition. As such, her prose is also influenced by post-modern conventions, shown through her frank unorthodoxy and twisted proclivities towards sex and sexuality, such as the constant implications of virginity and deflowering in both "The Bloody Chamber" and "The Tiger's Bride". Oftentimes, her writing is also considered to be something similar to magical realism in relation to the insertion of inexplicable magical elements. This is shown in "The Bloody Chamber" when the narrator is unable to clean the blood from what seems to be a normal key in a semi-realistic setting.

The time periods of the stories are early 20th century. For example, in "The Bloody Chamber" the existence of a transatlantic telephone implies a date of 1930 or later. On the other hand, the mention of painters such as Gustave Moreau and Odilon Redon, and of fashion designer Paul Poiret (who designs one of the heroine's gowns) all suggest a date before 1945. "The Lady of the House of Love" is clearly set on the eve of the First World War, and the young man's bicycle on which he arrives at the tradition-bound vampire's house is a symbol of the encroaching modernity which fundamentally altered European society after 1914.

=== Feminism ===
Angela Carter's short stories challenge the way women are represented in fairy tales, yet retain an air of tradition and convention through her voluptuously descriptive prose. For example, in the opening tale "The Bloody Chamber", which is a retelling of Bluebeard, Carter plays with the conventions of canonical fairy tales; instead of the heroine being rescued by the stereotypical male hero, she is rescued by her mother.

Carter effectively draws out the theme of feminism by contrasting traditional elements of Gothic fiction – which usually depicted female characters as weak and helpless – with strong female protagonists. By contrasting the barren and horrific atmosphere found typically within the Gothic to the strong heroines of her story, Carter is able to create sexually liberated female characters that are set against the more traditional backdrop of the fairy tale. In doing so, Carter reinvents the outdated conventions of fairy tales and offers insight on the archetypes and stereotypes of women in these well-known and celebrated stories. In particular, and especially in "The Bloody Chamber", Carter creates familial ties between her heroines and their mothers, where in the original fairy tales their mothers would have either died at the beginning of the story, or gone unmentioned. By creating and strengthening said bond, Carter inverts the trope of a lone woman and creates a chorus of agency, where once there was none. It is notable that the conventions Carter analyzes and reimagines are of a patriarchal nature. Many of the original fairy tales that she draws inspiration from illustrate female characters in a vulnerable, damsel-in-distress position. In giving her female characters more agency, Carter is directly responding to and critiquing these traditional patriarchal tropes.

The stories deal with themes of women's roles in relationships and marriage, their sexuality, coming of age and corruption. Stories such as "The Bloody Chamber" and "The Company of Wolves" explicitly deal with the horrific or corrupting aspects of marriage and/or sex and the balance of power within such relationships. Themes of female identity are explored in the "Beauty and the Beast" stories such as "The Tiger's Bride". In one instance, Beauty, the story's heroine, is described as removing the petals from a white rose as her father gambles her away; this is a seeming representation of the stripping away of the false layers of her personality to find her true identity, an image that finds a mirror in the story's fantastical conclusion.

=== Gothic fiction ===
Carter continues to toy with Gothic fiction and gender, in a way that utilizes classic Gothic symbolism to push the narrative forward. She writes of Gothic fiction that "characters and events are exaggerated beyond reality, to become symbols, ideas, and passions," all of which work towards the singular purpose of creating an uneasy atmosphere. In "The Bloody Chamber", she extrapolates on the importance of symbolism, by placing emphasis on images such as the ominous Gothic castle, the blood on the key, or a blood-red choker awarded the heroine as a wedding gift. As in the Gothic tradition, these artefacts foreshadow the story to come, and the fate of the heroine as she spills blood on the bed sheets after consummating her marriage, the blood of her husband's previous wives as she learns his dark secret, and the blood that is meant to be spilt from her neck, once the Marquis vows to chop her head off. Gothic images placed within these short stories emphasise terror and the gruesome, attempting to build an atmosphere, while also working to flip certain gendered tropes on their heads: in the end, it is the virgin's own blood, her feminine energy in the form of her mother and her quick thinking, that save her from a terrible fate.

Furthermore, Carter seems to draw heavily from the understanding of Gothic literature as following specific, gendered structures. As English Professor at University of Georgia Anne Williams states, "The male Gothic plot employs the Oedipus myth, while the female Gothic plot draws on the myth of Psyche and Eros." The tale of Psyche and Eros, or Cupid and Psyche, can often be found in such story iterations such as "Beauty and the Beast", of which "The Tiger's Bride" is heavily based. Within this framework, as well, Carter bases many of her stories off of the female tradition. Particularly, in "The Bloody Chamber", she reflects on the sexual nature of Psyche and the beast that is Eros, as the narrator is trapped in a castle and ravished for her virginity. Though, unlike the original tale, Carter continues to darken the narrative in order to fit the Gothic landscape, in such ways as emphasising the nature of sexual acts in accordance to such horrors as cannibalism. While from Eros and Psyche bloom love, the Marquis is constantly looking to devour the heroine, to mutilate her body and objectify her in a show of Gothic horror that Edgar Allan Poe often used to influence the dark undertones in his short stories.

=== Aestheticism ===
In "The Bloody Chamber", Angela Carter reflects on the nature of artistry. Here, the Marquis, based on the character of Bluebeard from the original tale, is an art dealer, whose art comes in the form of his murder, and the "aesthetic" display of his former wives' corpses. His current wife's role, in this case, "is to act as his Muse... he instructs her with pictorial representations, which functions as self portraits," in the form of his wives, "that depict his birth as an artist." The Marquis is first drawn to our narrator because of her artistry in her piano playing, and by lavishing gifts onto the heroine, such as the choker, he attempts to show her mirrored in the bodies and pictures of his previous wives. Here, Carter displays patriarchal values through her antagonist. By presenting himself as the typical artist, and his wife as the muse, he is literally attempting to kill her and her unique proclivities in order to indoctrinate her into his artistic method. He attempts to fetishize her and strip her of agency, a criticism of Carter's on the "male literary tradition" of martyring women (literally and metaphorically in fiction) in order to present the fruits of their artistic labour.

== Reception ==
=== Awards ===
The Bloody Chamber won the Cheltenham Festival Literary Prize in 1979.

=== Critical reception ===
The Bloody Chamber has received heavy praise and attention from numerous critics such as Jack Zipes (who called it a "remarkable collection") and Marina Warner (who, on its inspirational nature, said it "turned the key for [her] as a writer"). Neil Gaiman cited the book as one of his inspirations. In a 2019 essay in the book Lost Transmissions, Grady Hendrix said of Angela Carter: "She's someone who fantasy doesn't claim, and she's huge. The Bloody Chamber is one of the all-time great fantasy novels."

The critic Patricia Duncker, however, was more reserved in her praise, criticising it for not breaking enough taboos. She said "Carter could never have imagined Cinderella in bed with the fairy God-mother."

Several critical works have been published that focus on Carter's use of fairy tales in The Bloody Chamber and her other works.

The collection has been taught and studied in University literature courses. It has been used as part of the AQA English Literature, the OCR English Literature and Edexcel English Language & Literature syllabus for A-Levels in schools and colleges across the United Kingdom.

== Adaptations ==
=== Radio ===
Carter later adapted "The Company of Wolves" and "Puss-in-Boots" into radio plays which were broadcast on BBC Radio 3 in 1980 and 1982 respectively. The 1982 adaptation of "Puss in Boots" (as it was retitled) starred Andrew Sachs in the title role. The scripts for both of these plays were published in Carter's Come Unto These Yellow Sands and later the posthumous collection The Curious Room, which also included production notes.

=== Film ===
The 1984 film The Company of Wolves by Neil Jordan was based upon the werewolf stories in this collection, in particular the Little Red Riding Hood analogue "The Company of Wolves". Carter also directly contributed to the screenplay of this film. Carter's original screenplay for this film is published in The Curious Room. Jordan and Carter also discussed producing a film adaptation of "Vampirella", the radio drama that became "The Lady of the House of Love", but this project was never released.

=== Music video ===
Punk band Daisy Chainsaw adapted the story of "The Lady of the House of Love" for their 1992 music video for "Hope Your Dreams Come True" (from the EP of the same name and also later the album Eleventeen).

=== Theatre ===
The stories within The Bloody Chamber are a popular subject for theatrical adaptation. The story "The Bloody Chamber" has been adapted for the theatre more than once, including a performance by the "Zoo District" which was accompanied by an amateur film adaptation of "Wolf-Alice". "The Company of Wolves" is also a popular subject for adaptation by amateur/student theatre groups (e.g. by a Welsh drama college).

Neil Murray directed a haunting and erotic theatre production of Carter's story 'The Tiger's Bride' in 2001 at the Gulbenkian Studio, Newcastle Playhouse. Murray comments on his interest in Carter's work and refers to her discussion of fairy tales as 'an important medium.'

Read more: Neil Murray on his adaptation of The Bloody Chamber

In August 2013, Melbourne's Malthouse Theatre presented a stage adaptation of The Bloody Chamber by writer Van Badham, directed by Matthew Lutton, with composers David Chisholm (scoring for three live harps) and Jethro Woodward (live and replayed electronic soundscore). Set and costumedesign were by Anna Cordingley with lighting designer Paul Jackson. Save for a relatively brief appearance by Shelly Lauman, the piece was in essence performed by Alison Whyte. The three harpists were Jacinta Dennett, Jess Fotinos, and Yinuo Mu.

=== Music ===
The band The Parlour Trick featured a song called "The Lady of the House of Love" on their 2012 album A Blessed Unrest. Angela Carter is listed as an inspiration in the album notes. Wolf Alice is a band which named themselves after the story in the collection. The band Honeyblood also released a song, "Choker", on their 2014 self-titled album which retells "The Bloody Chamber".

== Sources ==
- Anonymous, "LS 819: Transformations: Freedom and Magic in Nineteenth Century "Fairy Stories"", (n.d.).
- Anonymous, "School of Theatre and Performance – Trinity College Carmarthen": scroll down to Nick Evans for evidence of the production of "The Company of Wolves".
- Charles N. Brown & William G. Contento, 2007."The Locus Index to Science Fiction (1984–1998); The Bloody Chamber and other stories", 2004: source for specific contents details.
- Angela Carter, The Bloody Chamber (Croydon: Vintage, 1979 (1995)), ISBN 0-09-958811-0.
- Angela Carter, The Bloody Chamber (London: Vintage, 1979 (2006)), p 4 ISBN 0-09-958811-0: source for Helen Simpson quotations and references (in introduction).
- Angela Carter, The Curious Room (London: Vintage, 1997), ISBN 0-09-958621-5: source for Mark Bell's production notes, which include a quotation from Neil Jordan.
- Daisy Chainsaw, "Hope Your Dreams Come True", 1992.
- John Haffenden, Novelists in Interview (New York: Methuen Press, 1985), ISBN 978-0-416-37600-5: source for Angela Carter quotation.
- Danielle M. Roemer and Christina Bacchilega (ed.), Angela Carter and the Fairy Tale (Detroit: Wayne State University Press, 1998), ISBN 0-8143-2905-5: source for Jack Zipes, "Crossing Boundaries with Wise Girls: Angela Carter's Fairy Tales for Children" and Marina Warner, "Ballerina: The Belled Girl Sends a Tape to an Impresario".
- "Zoo District", "Angela Carter's The Bloody Chamber; Adapted for the Stage and Directed by Kara Feely", 2005.
