= Lima a Hundred Years from Now =

Peruvian science fiction novel

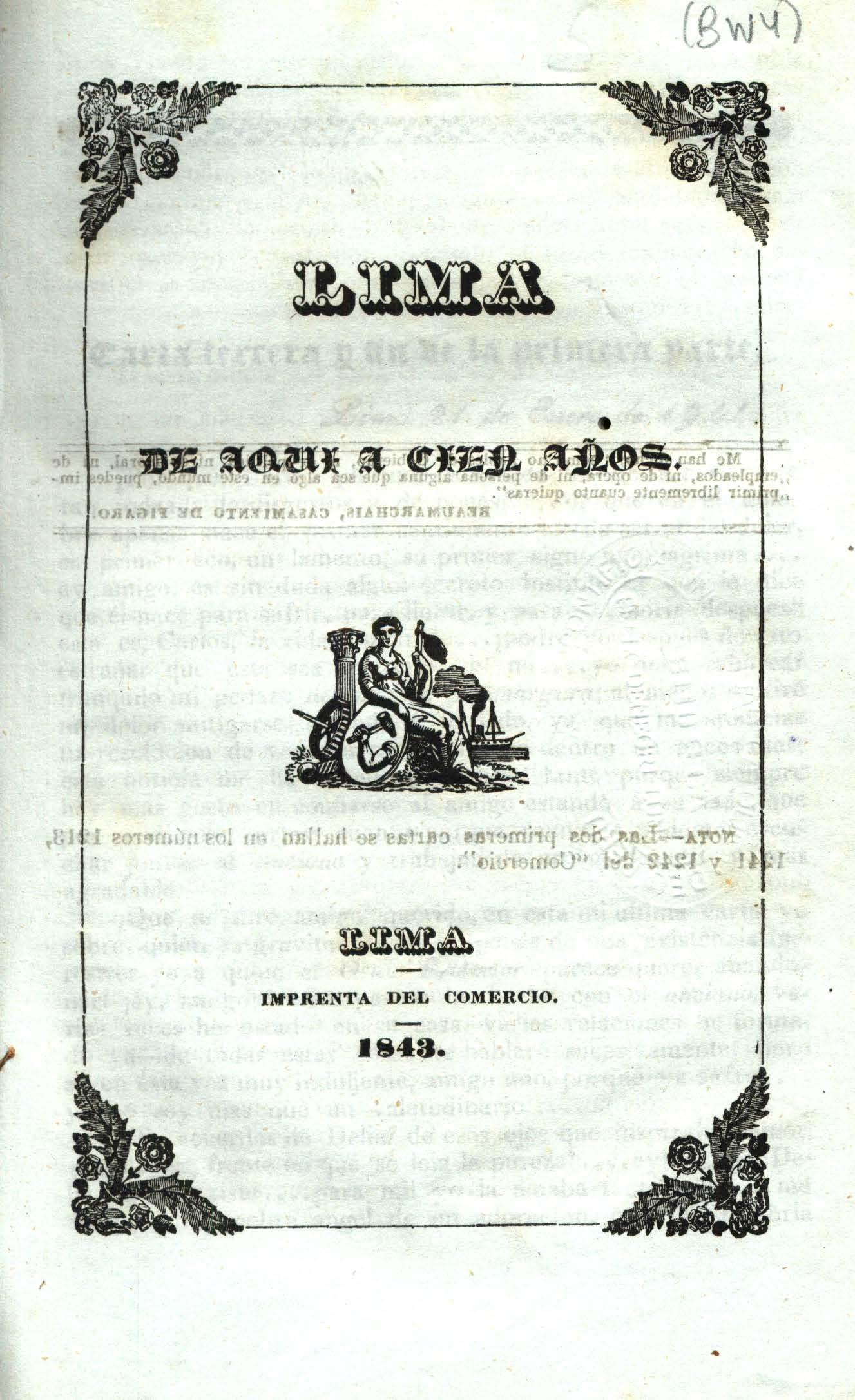
- Author: Julián Manuel del Portillo
- Original title: Lima: de aquí a cien años
- Language: Spanish
- Genre: Novel, science fiction, epistolary
- Publisher: El Comercio
- Publication date: 1843–1844
- Publication place: Peru
- Media type: Newspaper

Lima a Hundred Years from Now is a Peruvian epistolary science fiction novel written by Julián Manuel del Portillo, published in installments (between July 1843 and January 1844) in the newspaper El Comercio. It is considered both the first Peruvian novel and the first science fiction publication.

The novel is framed within the stylistic canon of the mid-19th century, featuring characteristics of both Gothic and science fiction novels, with elements of fantasy, utopia, and anticipation. As a reference, Jules Verne's first novel (which was also his first science fiction work), Paris in the 20th Century, was not written until 1859.

== Synopsis ==
In 1943, Artur and his friend Carlos del A. come back to reality, from where a genie, who paralyzed their existence, took them out for a century. Artur, in Lima; Carlos, in Cusco. Astonished, they find out that England, once a world power, has been wiped out and that Peru, the country they left when plunged into civil wars, is now a highly developed country. They tell each other all these events through letters, which are forwarded through airships that daily fly from Lima to Cusco.

Cusco features fantastic architecture: a gigantic pyramid has been built with 225 floors and 3 kilometers in height, along with a library housing 12 million books. A tunnel starts in Arequipa, passes through a volcano, and reaches the interior of the pyramid. These concepts also make the novel the first architectural utopia.
