= Ann Wood =

Ann or Anne Wood may refer to:

- Ann P. Wood, British microbiologist
- Ann Wood Henry, née Wood, treasurer of Lancaster County, Pennsylvania
- Ann Wood-Kelly, née Wood, American aviator
- Anne Wood (born 1937), English children’s TV producer
- Anne Wood (opera administrator) (1907–1998), British mezzo-soprano and opera administrator
- Anne Toppan Wilbur Wood, American translator, writer, and editor
- Anne Brancato Wood ( 1903–1972), American politician, member of the Pennsylvania House of Representatives

== See also ==
- Annie Wood (disambiguation)
- Anne Woods (disambiguation)
- Anna Wood (disambiguation)
