= Backwards to Britain =

Novel by Jules Verne

- Cover of the 1989 French edition
- Author: Jules Verne
- Original title: Voyage à reculons en Angleterre et en Ecosse
- Working title: Voyage en Angleterre et en Ecosse
- Translator: Janice Valls-Russell
- Language: French
- Published: 1989 (Paris: Le Cherche Midi); 1992 (Edinburgh: Chambers)
- Publication place: France
- Media type: Print
- ISBN: 978-286274147-5

Backwards to Britain (French: Voyage à reculons en Angleterre et en Ecosse) (Note: The title page of Verne's manuscript gives the title as Voyage ~~à reculons~~ en Angleterre et en Ecosse, with à reculons ("backwards") crossed out. The body of the text is headed with a different title, Essai de voyage en Angleterre et en Écosse. The 1989 published edition used Verne's full original title.) is a semi-autobiographical novel by the French writer Jules Verne, written in the fall and winter of 1859–1860 and not published until 1989.

The novel follows the travels of two Frenchmen, Jacques (representing Verne) and Jonathan (Verne's friend Aristide Hignard), on a journey from Paris to Scotland.

== Plot ==
Jacques Lavaret, a young Parisian man, is eager to visit Scotland. He is delighted when his friend, the composer Jonathan Savournon, announces that he can get a free trip to Britain, with room for a friend, on a steamer trading between Saint-Nazaire and Liverpool. Jacques, filled with enthusiasm and Anglophilia, sets off for the steamer in late July 1859, but when he gets to Nantes to meet up with Jonathan, he is faced with bad news. The steamer has been delayed some days, and will dock not in Saint-Nazaire but in Bordeaux, 500 kilometers south of Paris. The two friends spend the delay sightseeing in Nantes and traveling by another boat from there to Bordeaux. Jacques and Jonathan weather the adventures and mishaps of the voyage, amused at the irony of traveling "backwards", away from Britain, in order to get there.

After visiting Jonathan's friend Edmond R—, who shows them around the city, Jacques and Jonathan embark at last on the steamer for Liverpool. Jacques, who speaks no English, has difficulty communicating with the ship's commander, the Scottish Captain Speedy, but he is not alone; neither of Speedy's two pilots, picked up in Bordeaux, can speak the language either. The bilingual Jonathan does a little interpreting, and helps Jacques through some pronunciation errors when he tries to pepper his conversation with English phrases. Twenty-four days after leaving Nantes, the two friends arrive in Liverpool, where they marvel at unfamiliar English customs and are astounded at the depths of poverty and squalor in the streets. After meeting with a tradesman, Mr. Joe Kennedy, and his guest Sir John Sinclair, they travel by rail to Edinburgh.

Jacques and Jonathan explore the city, redolent with memories of Sir Walter Scott, whose novels Jacques adores. They visit many landmarks, including the Scott Monument, the Palace of Holyrood, Arthur's Seat (Jacques's first experience of a mountaintop view), and the beach at Portobello. They dine with the family of Mr. B—, Jonathan's brother's wife's uncle; Jacques is taken with Mr. B—'s daughter, Miss Amelia, who promises to draw up an itinerary for their sightseeing to come. Jacques and Jonathan see Calton Hill and Edinburgh Castle the next day, and dine with the B— family again. Following Miss Amelia's instructions, they travel by steamer up the Firth of Forth, dine with a Catholic priest in Oakley, Fife, and proceed by rail to Glasgow, which they discover to be as dingy as Liverpool. Then their rail route continues to Balloch and Loch Lomond, which they cross by boat, admiring the views of Luss and Ben Lomond. They drive by coach from Loch Lomond to Loch Katrine, reminded more than ever of Scott's novels. Crossing Loch Katrine with other passengers, including a bagpiper in traditional Highland dress, they reach the northernmost point of their travels. They dine in Callander and take a train to Stirling, where they admire Highland dress uniforms and pibrochs before heading back to Edinburgh. Sad to be leaving Scotland, they order tickets for London.

Arriving in London, they cross London Bridge and climb to the top of St Paul's Cathedral, marveling at its whispering gallery; then they see the Palace of Westminster, Westminster Abbey, Whitehall, and Trafalgar Square, and make their way through the West End. At the Princess's Theatre in Oxford Street, they see a production of Shakespeare's Macbeth. By the next morning, Jacques is tired of London, complaining that they are now sightseeing only from a sense of duty. They travel down the Thames and see Greenwich, the Tower of London, and Madame Tussaud's. Having spent a week in England and Scotland, they take a steamer back to France. Their tour was rushed, but colorful and memorable; they are now ready to take a different and much more leisurely kind of trip as they "travel backwards through their memories" to relive their experience of Britain.

== Themes ==
All my life I have delighted in the works of Sir Walter Scott, and during a never-to-be-forgotten tour in the British Isles, my happiest days were spent in Scotland. I still see, as in a vision, beautiful, picturesque Edinburgh, with its Heart of Midlothian, and many entrancing memories; the Highlands, world-forgotten Iona, and the wild Hebrides. Of course, to one familiar with the works of Scott, there is scarce a district of his native land lacking some association connected with the writer and his immortal work.

— Jules Verne

=== Literary sources ===
Verne's experience of Scotland, and his writings about it, come from a reader's point of view: they reflect that he had discovered the country in books before setting foot there himself. In particular, his view of Scotland is heavily influenced by the works of the novelist Sir Walter Scott and the poet James Macpherson. (Indeed, Verne's novels often describe Scotland simply as the land of Scott, or as that of his hero Rob Roy.)

Another source for Verne's Scottish themes came from the French writer Charles Nodier, who used his 1821 travels in Scotland as the impetus for two works he wrote that year: Promenades de Dieppe aux montagnes d’Écosse and Trilby ou le lutin d'Argail. Verne cites both Nodier and Scott in the first chapter of Backwards to Britain, as well as several other writers who influenced his conception of Britain: Charles Dickens in his novels The Pickwick Papers and Nicholas Nickleby; Louis Énault, author of Angleterre, Écosse, Irlande, voyage pittoresque (1859); and Francis Wey, author of Les Anglais chez eux : esquisses de mœurs et de voyage (1850–1). Other writers mentioned in the book include François-René de Chateaubriand, a distant relative of Verne himself; Victor Hugo, whose poem "Le 7 août 1829" from Les Rayons et les Ombres is quoted; and James Fenimore Cooper, an author often cited in Verne's novels.

=== Imagery ===
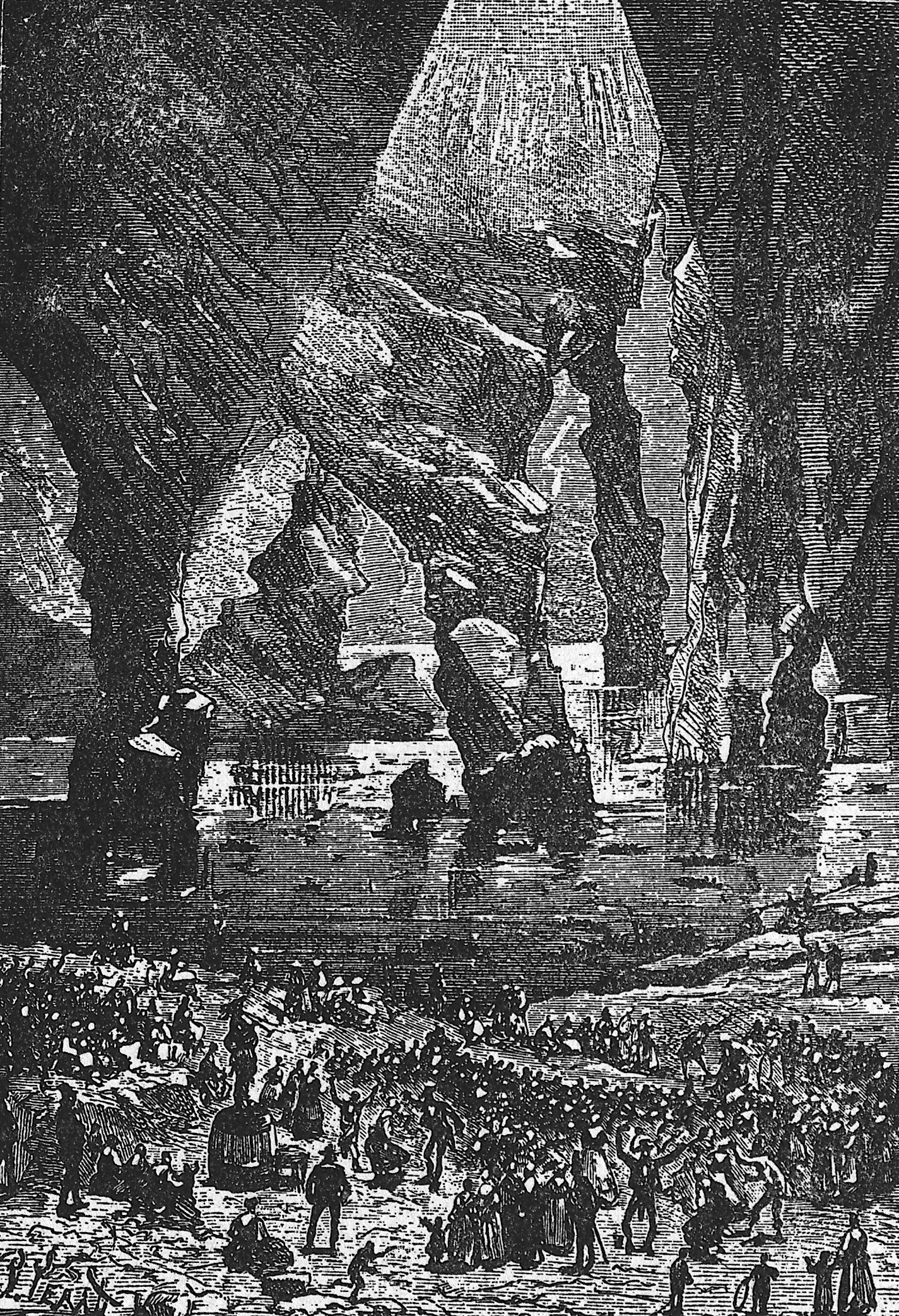
The underground city in Verne's The Black Indies

As numerous images in Backwards to Britain imply, such as the juxtaposition of Scott with James Watt or the description of modern gas taps in ancient castles, Verne was especially interested in emphasizing Scotland's evocative combination of a legendary past and an intriguingly modern, scientifically innovative present. In Verne's novels, Scotland is depicted a land of utopian possibilities, as is suggested by his fictional underground city New Aberfoyle in The Black Indies or the dreams of an ideal Scottish island settlement imagined in The Children of Captain Grant.

The idea of moving backwards, as reflected in both the French and the English published titles, is a central motif in the novel. Verne continued to explore it throughout the novels published during his lifetime, collectively known as the Voyages Extraordinaires. In these novels, progress is often characterized not merely as going forward into the future but also as revisiting and gaining a better understanding of the past and present.

== Publication ==
In 1862, Verne submitted Backwards to Britain to the publisher Pierre-Jules Hetzel. Hetzel rejected it, but he accepted another Verne manuscript involving the more timely themes of ballooning and African explorations; it was published in 1863 as Five Weeks in a Balloon. The rejected manuscript of Backwards to Britain was eventually acquired by the Bibliothèque de la Ville de Nantes.

Backwards to Britain was first published in an edition edited by Christian Robin, Voyage à reculons en Angleterre et en Ecosse (Paris: Le Cherche Midi, 1989), including the text, facsimiles of two pages of the manuscript, a map, and 84 images from contemporary sources. An English translation by Janice Valls-Russell was published by W & R Chambers Ltd in 1992.

== Notes ==
=== Citations ===
- Belloc, Marie A. (February 1895), "Jules Verne at Home", Jules Verne Collection, Zvi Har’El, archived from the original on 17 November 2019
- Butcher, William (1992), "Introduction", in Verne, Jules (ed.), Backwards to Britain, Edinburgh: Chambers, pp. vii–x
- Butcher, William (2008), Jules Verne: The Definitive Biography (revised ed.), Hong Kong: Acadien
- Dehs, Volker; Margot, Jean-Michel; Har’El, Zvi (2007), "The Complete Jules Verne Bibliography: IV. Other Novels", Jules Verne Collection, Zvi Har’El
- Kleiman-Lafon, Sylvie (2008), "L'Utopie gothique de Jules Verne au pays de Rob Roy", Études écossaises, 11 (11): 51–67, doi:10.4000/etudesecossaises.67, S2CID 191315875
- Unwin, Timothy (2005), Jules Verne: Journeys in Writing, Liverpool: Liverpool University Press
- Verne, Jules (1992), Backwards to Britain, Edinburgh: Chambers
