= Annie Wood (disambiguation) =

Annie Wood (born 1971) is an American actress.

Annie Wood may also refer to:

- Annie Wood Besant (née Annie Wood; 1847–1933), British social activist

== See also ==
- Ann Wood (disambiguation)
