= Anna Wood =

Anna Wood may refer to:

- Anna Wood (born 1980) (1980–1995), died after taking an MDMA tablet at a dance party
- Anna Wood (canoeist) (born 1966), Australian flatwater canoeist
- Anna Wood (actress) (born 1985), American actress
- Anna Lomax Wood (born 1944), American anthropologist
- Anna Cogswell Wood (1850–1940), American writer, art collector and teacher

== See also ==
- Ann Wood (disambiguation)
