= A Priest in 1839 =

Book by Jules Verne

A Priest in 1839 (French: Un prêtre en 1839) is an unfinished novel by Jules Verne. Written around 1845-1848, it was published in 1992, long after the author's death.
