= Anne Woods =

Anne Woods may refer to:

- Anne Woods Patterson (born 1949), American diplomat and career Foreign Service Officer
- Anne Woods (gurner) (1947–2015), world gurning champion 28 times
- Holly Woods (born 1953), real name Anne Woods

== See also ==
- Ann Wood (disambiguation)
