= Anne Toppan Wilbur Wood =

- Born: June 20, 1817; Wendell
- Died: September 14, 1864 (aged 47); Marietta
- Parent(s): Hervey Wilbur

Anne Toppan Wilbur Wood (June 20, 1817 – September 14, 1864) was an American translator, writer, and editor who published under the names Anne T. Wilbur, Anne T. Wood, Annie T Wood, Florence Leight, and Mrs. John Procter. She is the first person to have translated Jules Verne into English.

Anne Toppan Wilbur Wood was born on June 20, 1817 in Wendell, Massachusetts. She was the daughter of Hervey Wilbur, Congregationalist minister and author. She worked as a music teacher and as editor of the Ladies’ Magazine and Ladies’ Casket.

Her first translation of Verne was the short story "A Voyage in a Balloon," published in Sartain’s Union Magazine of Literature and Art, May 1852. She also translated "Martin Paz" as "The Pearl of Lima. A Story of True Love," published in Graham’s Magazine, April 1853. Her other translations include The Romance of a Mummy (1863), a translation of Théophile Gautier's Le Roman de la Momie (1858), and The Solitary of Juan Fernandez; or, The Real Robinson Crusoe (1851). a translation of Seul ! (1857) by X. B. Saintine.

== Bibliography ==
- The Solitary of Juan Fernandez; or, The Real Robinson Crusoe, by X. B. Saintine, Ticknor, Reed, and Fields, Boston: 1851
- Chrisna; the Queen of the Danube, by Santine, Translated from the French by Anne Toppan (Wilbur) Wood Delisser & Procter, New York: 1859
- The Roman Question, by Edmond François Valentin About, translated by Annie T. Wood, J. E. Tilton and Co., Boston: 1859
- The Romance of the Mummy, by Théophile Gautier, Columbus, Ohio: 1860; Bradburn, New York: 1863
