= Paris in the Twentieth Century =

1994 novel by Jules Verne

- Cover of the French edition of Paris in the 20th Century, inspired by early 20th-century book design.
- Author: Jules Verne
- Original title: Paris au xx^{e} siècle
- Translator: Richard Howard
- Language: French
- Genre: Science fiction novel
- Publisher: Hachette
- Publication date: 1994
- Publication place: France
- English publication date: 1996
- Media type: Print

Paris in the Twentieth Century (French: Paris au xx^{e} siècle) is the 64th and final novel by Jules Verne. The book presents Paris in August 1960, 97 years in Verne's future, when society places value only on business and technology.

Written in 1860, but first published in 1994, the novel follows a young man who struggles unsuccessfully to live in a technologically advanced but culturally backward world. The work paints a grim, dystopian view of a technological civilization.

Many of Verne's predictions are remarkably on target. However, his publisher, Pierre-Jules Hetzel, did not accept the book because he thought that it was too unbelievable and that its sales prospects would be inferior to those of Verne's previous work, Five Weeks in a Balloon.

== Summary ==
The novel's main character is 16-year-old Michel Dufrénoy, who graduates with a major in literature and the classics, but finds they have been forgotten in a futuristic world where only business and technology are valued. Michel, whose father was a musician, is a poet born too late.

Michel has been living with his respectable uncle, Monsieur Stanislas Boutardin, and his family. The day after graduation, Boutardin tells Michel that he is to start working at a banking company. Boutardin doubts Michel can do anything in the business world.

The rest of that day, Michel searches for literature by classic 19th-century writers, such as Hugo and Balzac. Nothing but books about technology are available in bookstores. Michel's last resort is the Imperial Library. The librarian turns out to be his long-hidden uncle, Monsieur Huguenin. Huguenin, still working in the arts, is considered a "disgrace" to the rest of the family, and so was barred from attending Michel's birthdays, graduations, and other family events, though he has followed Michel's life—from a distance. This is the first time they meet in person.

At his new job, Michel fails at each task with Casmodage and Co. Bank until he is assigned to The Ledger, where Michel dictates the accounts for bookkeeper Monsieur Quinsonnas. Quinsonnas, a kindred spirit of 30, writes the bookkeeping information on The Ledger. Quinsonnas tells Michel that this is a job he can do in order to eat, have an apartment, and support himself while he continues working on a mysterious musical project that will bring him fame and fortune. Michel's fear of not fitting in is resolved; he can be a reader and still work on his own writing after work.

The pair visit Uncle Huguenin and are joined by other visitors, Michel's former teacher Monsieur Richelot and Richelot's granddaughter, Mademoiselle Lucy. Quinsonnas introduces Michel to his friend, Jacques Aubanet, who dreams of being a soldier – a dream that is impossible, because warfare has become so scientific that there is really no need for soldiers anymore. Only chemists and mechanics are able to work the killing machines, and this profession is denied to even them, because "the engines of war" have become so efficient that war is inconceivable and all countries are at a perpetual stalemate.

Before long, Michel and Lucy are in love. Michel discusses women with Quinsonnas, who sadly explains that what once was considered a woman does not exist anymore: due to mindless, repetitive factory work and careful attention to finance and science, most women have become cynical, ugly, neurotic career women. In fury, Quinsonnas spills ink on The Ledger, and he and Michel are fired on the spot. Quinsonnas leaves for Germany.

In a society without war, or musical and artistic progress, there is no news, so Michel can't even become a journalist. He ends up living in Quinsonnas' empty apartment while writing superb poetry, but lives in such poverty that he has to eat synthetic foods derived from coal. He eventually writes a book of poetry entitled Hopes which is rejected by every publisher in Paris.

As the year 1961 draws to a close, all of Europe enters a winter of unprecedented ferocity. All agriculture is compromised and food supplies are destroyed, resulting in mass famine. The temperature drops to thirty degrees below, and every river in Europe freezes solid. In despair, Michel spends his last bit of money on violets for Lucy, but finds that she has disappeared from her apartment, evicted when her grandfather lost his job as the university's last teacher of rhetoric. He is unable to locate her amongst the thousands of starving people in Paris. He spends the entire evening stumbling around Paris in a delirious state. Michel becomes convinced that he is being hunted by the Demon of Electricity, but no matter where he goes, he is unable to escape its presence.

In the climax of the story, the heartbroken Michel, bereft of friends and loved ones, wanders through the frozen, mechanized, electrical wonders of Paris. The subjective narrative becomes steadily more surreal as the suffering artist, in a final paroxysm of despair, unconsciously circles an old cemetery and finally collapses comatose in the snow.

== Predictions for 1960 ==
The book's description of the technology of 1960 is in some ways remarkably close to the actual technology of the 1960s. The book describes in detail advances such as cars powered by internal combustion engines ("gas-cabs") together with the necessary supporting infrastructure such as gas stations and paved asphalt roads; elevated and underground passenger train systems and high-speed trains powered by magnetism and compressed air; skyscrapers; electric lights that illuminate entire cities at night; fax machines ("picture-telegraphs"); elevators; primitive computers that can send messages to each other in a network somewhat resembling the internet (described as sophisticated electrically powered mechanical calculators that can send information to each other across vast distances); wind power; automated security systems; the electric chair; and remote-controlled weapons systems, as well as weapons destructive enough to make war unthinkable.

The book also predicts the growth of suburbs and mass higher education (the opening scene has Dufrénoy attending a graduation of 250,000 students), department stores, and massive hotels. A version of feminism has also arisen, with women moving into workplaces and a rise in illegitimate births. It also makes accurate predictions of 20th-century music, predicts the rise of electronic music, describes a musical instrument similar to a synthesizer, and outlines the replacement of classical music performances with recorded music. It predicts that the entertainment industry would be dominated by lewd stage plays, often involving nudity and sexually explicit scenes.

== Publication deferred ==
Jules Verne's publisher, Pierre-Jules Hetzel, thought that the book's pessimism would damage Verne's then-booming career, and suggested that he wait 20 years to publish it. Hetzel wrote to Verne about a draft of the novel that he had just seen:

"I was not expecting perfection — to repeat, I knew that you were attempting the impossible — but I was hoping for something better."

Hetzel was also critical of Verne for not covering new ground with the novel:

"In this piece, there is not a single issue concerning the real future that is properly resolved, no critique that hasn't already been made and remade before. I am surprised at you ... [it is] lacklustre and lifeless."

With that, Verne put the manuscript aside. While the whereabouts of the manuscript were known since Verne's death, a story of its loss and discovery was created as a marketing ploy. The original French text was published in 1994 and an English translation by Richard Howard was published by Random House in 1996.

== Literary significance and criticism ==
The appearance of Verne's lost novel caused a stir among modern critics, who mostly received the book warmly, greeting it as "prescient and plausible". On the other hand, some found the book every bit as unnecessarily pessimistic about the future as Verne's publisher had.

The book was a bestseller in France, where it was heavily promoted before publication. Some critics were put off by the publisher's hype about the book, although most readily admitted that it was "a work of inestimable historical importance".

One critic, Evelyn C. Leeper, suggested that Verne might be a good candidate for a Hugo Award for Best Novel in 1996, and wrote that she had not read very many novels that were much better than Verne's work that year. The Hugo Award is given annually to honor the best science fiction of the preceding year.

The novel is also of importance to scholars of Verne's literary achievements, some of whom had long asserted that none of his works ever came close to prophesying the future of a whole civilization.
