= Aristide Hignard =

French composer (1822–1898)

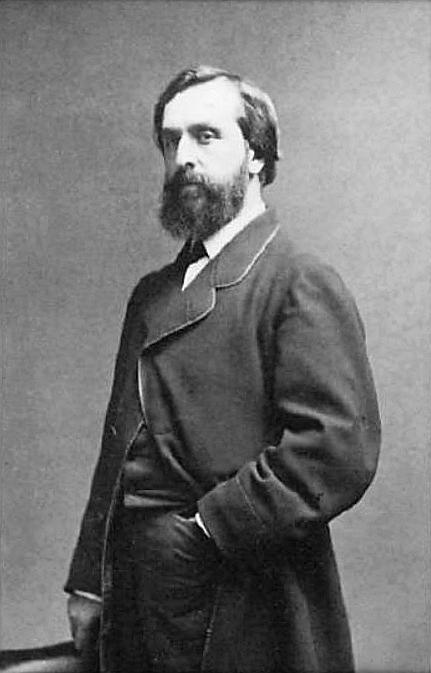
Aristide Hignard

Jean-Louis Aristide Hignard (20 May 1822 – 20 March 1898) was a French composer of light opera notable as a friend of Jules Verne, also from Nantes and six years Hignard's junior, some of whose librettos and verse he set to music.

== Life and music ==
The son of a shipowner, Hignard was born in Nantes and studied at the Paris Conservatory with Fromental Halévy and won the Second Grand Prix de Rome in 1850 with the cantata Emma et Eginhard. His first comic opera Le Visionnaire was published in 1851.

During the 1850s Hignard composed four comic operas, for which his childhood friend Jules Verne provided the librettos. In 1861, the operetta Les Musiciens de l'orchestre was performed, which Hignard had composed together with Léo Delibes and Jules Erlanger (and probably also Jacques Offenbach).

For a long time, Hignard worked on his main work, the five-act opera Hamlet based on a libretto by Pierre de Garal. It was premiered in 1868 with great success. He also composed a series of songs (partly based on texts by Verne) as well as waltzes and melodies for the piano.

He died in Vernon.

== Works ==
- La Mille et deuxième nuit, opera with libretto by Jules Verne (1850), never performed
- Le Visionnaire, opéra-comique in 1 act (1851)
- Le Colin-maillard (Jules Verne and Michel Carré), opéra-comique in 1 act (1853)
- Les Compagnons de la Marjolaine (J. Verne and M. Carré) opéra-comique in 1 act (1855)
- Monsieur de Chimpanzé (J. Verne), operetta (1858)
- L'Auberge des Ardennes (J. Verne and M. Carré), opéra-comique in 1 act (1860)
- Le Nouveau Pourceaugnac, played at the Bouffes-Parisiens (1860)
- Les Musiciens de l'orchestre, a collaboration with Léo Delibes (1861)
- Hamlet, opéra (1868)
- Rimes et mélodies, on poems by Jules Verne (1857–63)

== Recordings ==
- Mélodies inédites. Music by Hignard and one song Zouaves! by Alfred Dufresne (1822–1872), performed by Françoise Masset and Emmanuel Strosser (L'Académie de Bretagne et des Pays de Loire, 2005).

== Bibliography ==
- Patrick Barbier, "Hignard et Verne: Les Mélodies de l'amitié", in Voyage autour de Jules Verne (Académie de Bretagne et des Pays de la Loire, 2000).
- Alexandre Tarrieu, "Aristide Hignard (1822–1898)", in Revue Jules Verne, no. 11 (2001).
