= Jules Verne =

French writer (1828–1905)

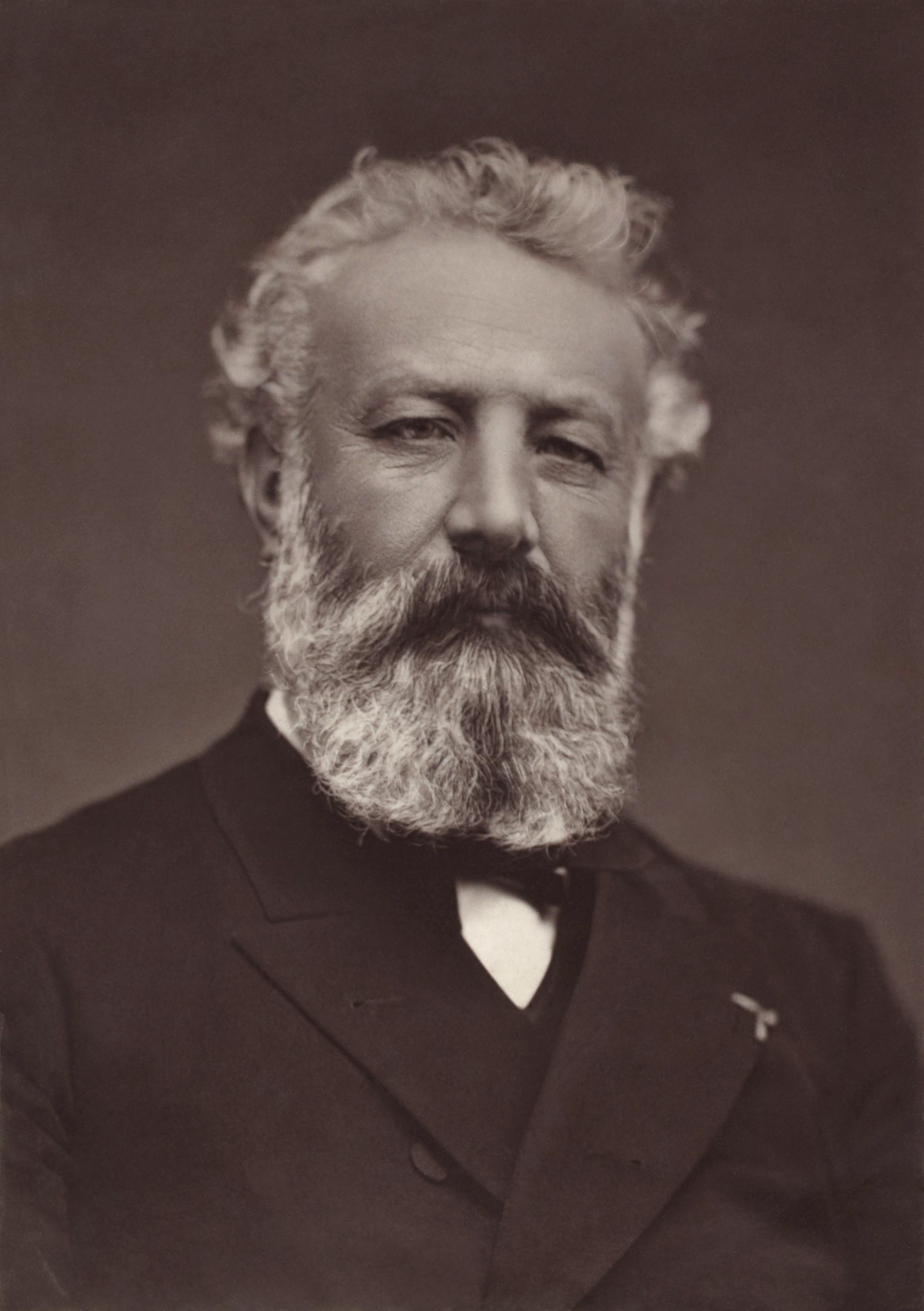
- Verne in 1884
- Born: 8 February 1828; Nantes, Brittany, France
- Died: 24 March 1905 (aged 77); Amiens, Picardy, France
- Occupation: Writer
- Spouse: Honorine Anne Hébée du Fraysne de Viane (m. 1857)
- Children: 3, including Michel
- Writing career
- Genres: Science fiction; children's books; novel; novella; drama; poetry; song; autobiography; non-fiction
- Notable works: Around the World in Eighty Days; Journey to the Centre of the Earth; Twenty Thousand Leagues Under the Seas; The Mysterious Island; From the Earth to the Moon; In Search of the Castaways (Note: These six, and most of Verne's novels, were published in the Voyages extraordinaires series.)
- Notable awards: Legion of Honour – Officer; 1892
- Movements: Romanticism; Neo-romanticism

Jules Gabriel Verne (/vɜːrn/ VURN; French: [ʒyl ɡabʁijɛl vɛʁn]; 8 February 1828 – 24 March 1905) was a French novelist, poet, and playwright.

His collaboration with the publisher Pierre-Jules Hetzel led to the creation of the Voyages extraordinaires, a series of bestselling adventure novels including Journey to the Center of the Earth (1864), Twenty Thousand Leagues Under the Seas (1870), and Around the World in Eighty Days (1872). His novels are generally set in the second half of the 19th century, taking into account contemporary scientific knowledge and the technological advances of the time.

In addition to his novels, he wrote numerous plays, short stories, autobiographical accounts, poetry, songs, and scientific, artistic and literary studies. His work has been adapted for film and television since the beginning of cinema, as well as for comic books, theater, opera, music and video games.

Verne is considered to be an important author in France and most of Europe, where he has had a wide influence on the literary avant-garde and on surrealism. His reputation was markedly different in the Anglosphere where he had often been labeled a writer of genre fiction or children's books, largely because of the highly abridged and altered translations in which his novels have often been printed. Since the 1980s, his literary reputation has improved.

Jules Verne has been the second most-translated author in the world since 1979, ranking below Agatha Christie and above William Shakespeare. He has sometimes been called the "father of science fiction", a title that has also been given to H. G. Wells and Hugo Gernsback. In the 2010s, he was the most translated French author in the world. In France, 2005 was declared "Jules Verne Year" on the occasion of the centenary of the writer's death.

== Life ==
=== Early life ===
Verne was born on 8 February 1828, on Île Feydeau, a then small artificial island on the river Loire within the town of Nantes (later filled in and incorporated into the surrounding land area), in No. 4 Rue Olivier-de-Clisson, the house of his maternal grandmother Dame Sophie Marie Adélaïde Julienne Allotte de La Fuÿe (born Guillochet de La Perrière). His parents were Pierre Verne, an avoué originally from Provins, and Sophie Allotte de La Fuÿe, a Nantes woman from a local family of navigators and shipowners, of distant Scottish descent. (Note: Jules-Verne 1976, p. 1: "On his mother's side, Verne is known to be descended from one 'N. Allott, Scotsman', who came to France to serve in the Scots Guards of Louis XI and rose to earn a title (in 1462). He built his castle, complete with dovecote or fuye (a privilege in the royal gift), near Loudun in Anjou and took the noble name of Allotte de la Fuye.") In 1829, the Verne family moved some hundred metres away to No. 2 Quai Jean-Bart, where Verne's brother Paul was born the same year. Three sisters, Anne "Anna" (1836), Mathilde (1839), and Marie (1842), followed.

In 1834, at the age of six, Verne was sent to boarding school at 5 Place du Bouffay in Nantes. The teacher, Madame Sambin, was the widow of a naval captain who had disappeared some 30 years before. Madame Sambin often told the students that her husband was a shipwrecked castaway and that he would eventually return like Robinson Crusoe from his desert island paradise. The theme of the robinsonade would stay with Verne throughout his life and appear in many of his novels, some of which include The Mysterious Island (1874), The Castaways of the Flag (1900), and The School for Robinsons (1882).

In 1836, Verne went on to École Saint‑Stanislas, a Catholic school suiting the pious religious tastes of his father. Verne quickly distinguished himself in mémoire (recitation from memory), geography, Greek, Latin, and singing. In the same year, 1836, Pierre Verne bought a vacation house at 29 Rue des Réformés in the village of Chantenay (now part of Nantes) on the Loire. In his brief memoir Souvenirs d'enfance et de jeunesse (Memories of Childhood and Youth, 1890), Verne recalled a deep fascination with the river and with the many merchant vessels navigating it. He also took vacations at Brains, in the house of his uncle Prudent Allotte, a retired shipowner, who had gone around the world and served as mayor of Brains from 1828 to 1837. Verne took joy in playing interminable rounds of the Game of the Goose with his uncle, and both the game and his uncle's name would be memorialized in two late novels (The Will of an Eccentric (1900) and Robur the Conqueror (1886), respectively).

Legend has it that in 1839, at the age of 11, Verne secretly procured a spot as cabin boy on the three-mast ship Coralie with the intention of traveling to the Indies and bringing back a coral necklace for his cousin Caroline. The evening the ship set out for the Indies, it stopped first at Paimbœuf where Pierre Verne arrived just in time to catch his son and make him promise to travel "only in his imagination". It is now known that the legend is an exaggerated tale invented by Verne's first biographer, his niece Marguerite Allotte de La Fuÿe, though it may have been inspired by a real incident.

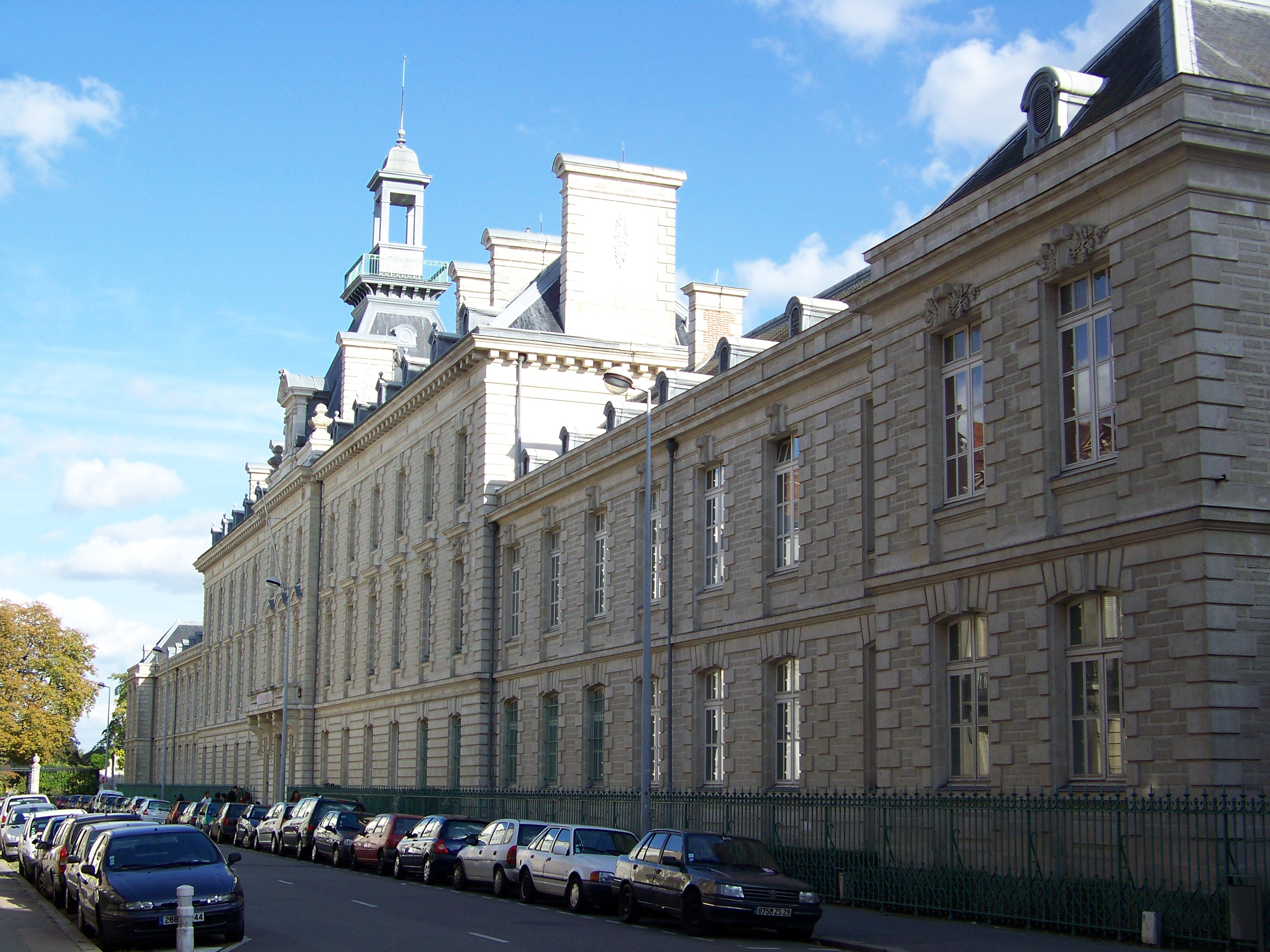
The Lycée Royal (now Georges Clemenceau), where Verne studied

In 1840, the Vernes moved again to a large apartment at No. 6 Rue Jean-Jacques-Rousseau, where the family's youngest child, Marie, was born in 1842. In the same year Verne entered another religious school, the Petit Séminaire de Saint-Donatien, as a lay student. His unfinished novel Un prêtre en 1839 (A Priest in 1839), written at age 19 and the earliest of his prose works to survive, describes the seminary in disparaging terms. From 1844 to 1846, Verne and his brother were enrolled in the Lycée Royal (now the Lycée Georges-Clemenceau) in Nantes. After finishing classes in rhetoric and philosophy, he took the baccalauréat at Rennes and received the grade "Good Enough" on 29 July 1846.

By 1847, when Verne was 19, he had taken seriously to writing long works in the style of Victor Hugo, beginning Un prêtre en 1839 and seeing two verse tragedies, Alexandre VI and La Conspiration des poudres (The Gunpowder Plot), to completion. However, his father took it for granted that Verne, being the firstborn son of the family, would not attempt to make money in literature but would instead inherit the family law practice.

In 1847, Verne's father sent him to Paris, primarily to begin his studies in law school, and secondarily (according to family legend) to distance him temporarily from Nantes. His cousin Caroline, with whom he was in love, was married on 27 April 1847, to Émile Dezaunay, a man of 40, with whom she would have five children.

After a short stay in Paris, where he passed first-year law exams, Verne returned to Nantes for his father's help in preparing for the second year. (Provincial law students were in that era required to go to Paris to take exams.) While in Nantes, he met Rose Herminie Arnaud Grossetière, a young woman one year his senior, and fell intensely in love with her. He wrote and dedicated some thirty poems to her, including La Fille de l'air (The Daughter of Air), which describes her as "blonde and enchanting / winged and transparent". His passion seems to have been reciprocated, at least for a short time, but Grossetière's parents frowned upon the idea of their daughter marrying a young student of uncertain future. They married her instead to Armand Terrien de la Haye, a rich landowner ten years her senior, on 19 July 1848.

The sudden marriage sent Verne into deep frustration. He wrote a hallucinatory letter to his mother, apparently composed in a state of half-drunkenness, in which under pretext of a dream he described his misery. This requited but aborted love affair seems to have permanently marked the author and his work, and his novels include a significant number of young women married against their will (Gérande in Master Zacharius (1854), Sava in Mathias Sandorf (1885), Ellen in A Floating City (1871), etc.), to such an extent that the scholar Christian Chelebourg attributed the recurring theme to a "Hermione complex". The incident also led Verne to bear a grudge against his birthplace and Nantes society, which he criticized in his poem La sixième ville de France (The Sixth City of France).

=== Studies in Paris ===
In July 1848, Verne left Nantes again for Paris, where his father intended him to finish law studies and take up law as a profession. He obtained permission from his father to rent a furnished apartment at 24 Rue de l'Ancienne-Comédie, which he shared with Édouard Bonamy, another student of Nantes origin. (On his 1847 Paris visit, Verne had stayed at 2 Rue Thérèse, the house of his aunt Charuel, on the Butte Saint-Roch.)

Verne arrived in Paris during a time of political upheaval: the French Revolution of 1848. In February, Louis Philippe I had been overthrown and had fled; on 24 February, a provisional government of the Second Republic took power, but political demonstrations continued, and social tension remained. In June, barricades went up in Paris, and the government sent Louis-Eugène Cavaignac to crush the insurrection. Verne entered the city shortly before the election of Louis-Napoléon Bonaparte as the first president of the Republic, a state of affairs that would last until the coup d'état of 1851. In a letter to his family, Verne described the bombarded state of the city after the recent June Days uprising but assured them that the anniversary of Bastille Day had gone by without any significant conflict.

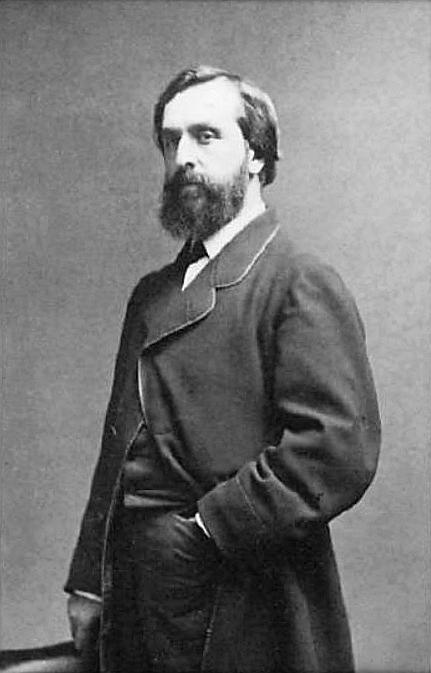
Aristide Hignard

Verne used his family connections to make an entrance into Paris society. His uncle Francisque de Chatêaubourg introduced him into literary salons, and Verne particularly frequented those of Mme de Barrère, a friend of his mother's. While continuing his law studies, he fed his passion for the theater, writing numerous plays. Verne later recalled: "I was greatly under the influence of Victor Hugo, indeed, very excited by reading and re-reading his works. At that time I could have recited by heart whole pages of Notre Dame de Paris, but it was his dramatic work that most influenced me." Another source of creative stimulation came from a neighbor: living on the same floor in the Rue de l'Ancienne-Comédie apartment house was a young composer, Aristide Hignard, with whom Verne soon became good friends, and Verne wrote several texts for Hignard to set as chansons.

During this period, Verne's letters to his parents primarily focused on expenses and on a suddenly appearing series of violent stomach cramps, the first of many he would suffer from during his life. (Modern scholars have hypothesized that he suffered from colitis; Verne believed the illness to have been inherited from his mother's side.) Rumors of an outbreak of cholera in March 1849 exacerbated these medical concerns. Yet another health problem would strike in 1851 when Verne suffered the first of four attacks of facial paralysis. These attacks, rather than being psychosomatic, were due to an inflammation in the middle ear, though this cause remained unknown to Verne during his life.

In the same year, Verne was required to enlist in the French army, but the sortition process spared him, to his great relief. He wrote to his father: "You should already know, dear papa, what I think of the military life, and of these domestic servants in livery. ... You have to abandon all dignity to perform such functions." Verne's strong antiwar sentiments, to the dismay of his father, would remain steadfast throughout his life.

Though writing profusely and frequenting the salons, Verne diligently pursued his law studies and graduated with a licence en droit in January 1851.

=== Literary debut ===
Thanks to his visits to salons, Verne came into contact in 1849 with Alexandre Dumas through the mutual acquaintance of a celebrated chirologist of the time, the Chevalier d'Arpentigny. Verne became close friends with Dumas' son, Alexandre Dumas fils, and showed him a manuscript for a stage comedy, Les Pailles rompues (The Broken Straws). The two young men revised the play together, and Dumas, through arrangements with his father, had it produced by the Opéra-National at the Théâtre Historique in Paris, opening on 12 June 1850.

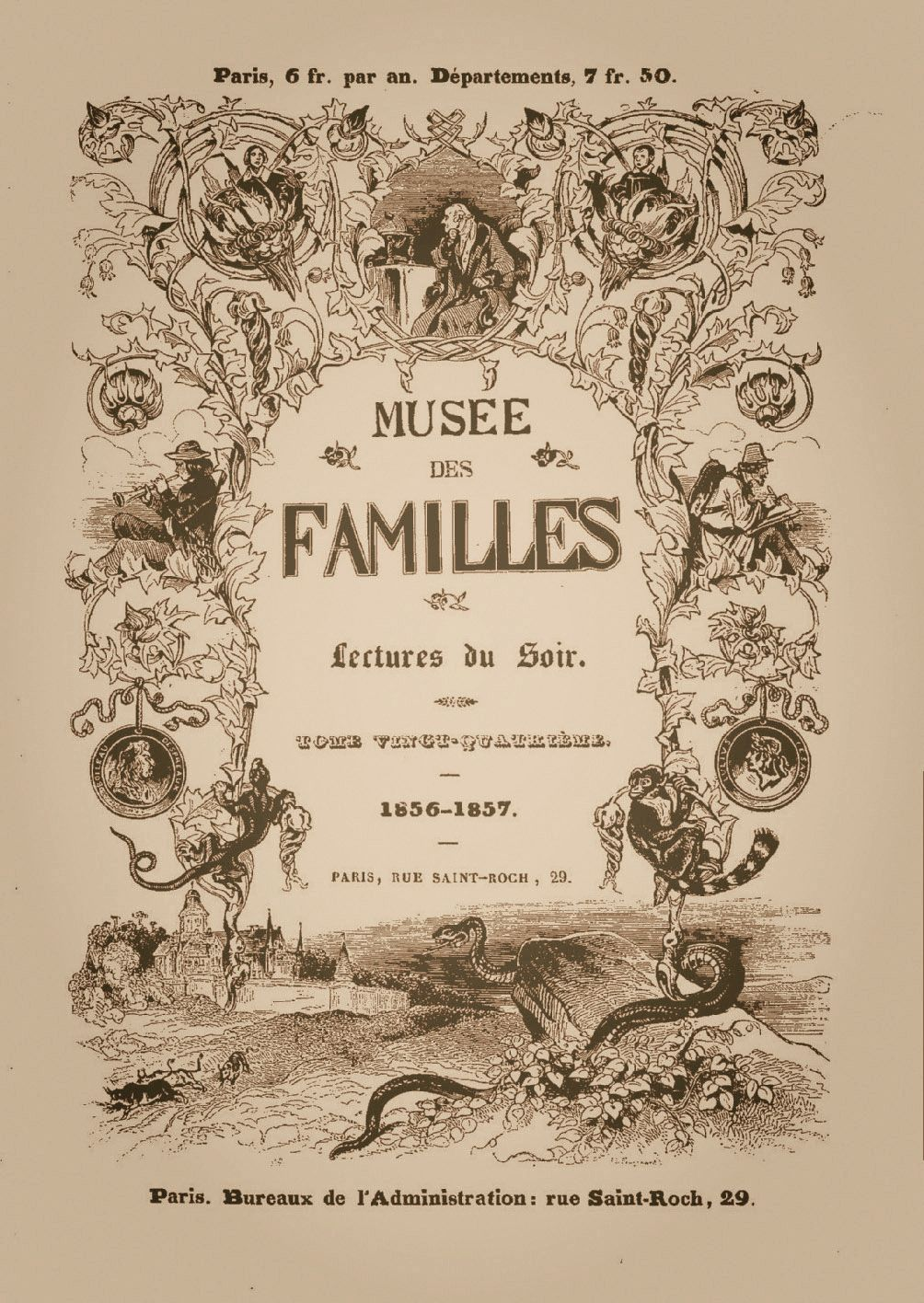
Cover of an 1856–57 issue of Musée des familles

In 1851, Verne met with a fellow writer from Nantes, Pierre-Michel-François Chevalier (known as "Pitre-Chevalier"), the editor-in-chief of the magazine Musée des familles (The Family Museum). Pitre-Chevalier was looking for articles about geography, history, science, and technology, and was keen to make sure that the educational component would be made accessible to large popular audiences using a straightforward prose style or an engaging fictional story. Verne, with his delight in diligent research, especially in geography, was a natural for the job. Verne first offered him a short historical adventure story, The First Ships of the Mexican Navy, written in the style of James Fenimore Cooper, whose novels had deeply influenced him. Pitre-Chevalier published it in July 1851, and in the same year published a second short story by Verne, A Voyage in a Balloon (August 1851). The latter story, with its combination of adventurous narrative, travel themes, and detailed historical research, would later be described by Verne as "the first indication of the line of novel that I was destined to follow".

Dumas fils put Verne in contact with Jules Seveste, a stage director who had taken over the directorship of the Théâtre Historique and renamed it the Théâtre Lyrique. Seveste offered Verne the job of secretary of the theater, with little or no salary attached. Verne accepted, using the opportunity to write and produce several comic operas written in collaboration with Hignard and the prolific librettist Michel Carré. To celebrate his employment at the Théâtre Lyrique, Verne joined with ten friends to found a bachelors' dining club, the Onze-sans-femme (Eleven Bachelors).

For some time, Verne's father pressed him to abandon his writing and begin a business as a lawyer. However, Verne argued in his letters that he could only find success in literature. The pressure to plan for a secure future in law reached its climax in January 1852, when his father offered Verne his own Nantes law practice. Faced with this ultimatum, Verne decided conclusively to continue his literary life and refuse the job, writing: "Am I not right to follow my own instincts? It's because I know who I am that I realize what I can be one day."

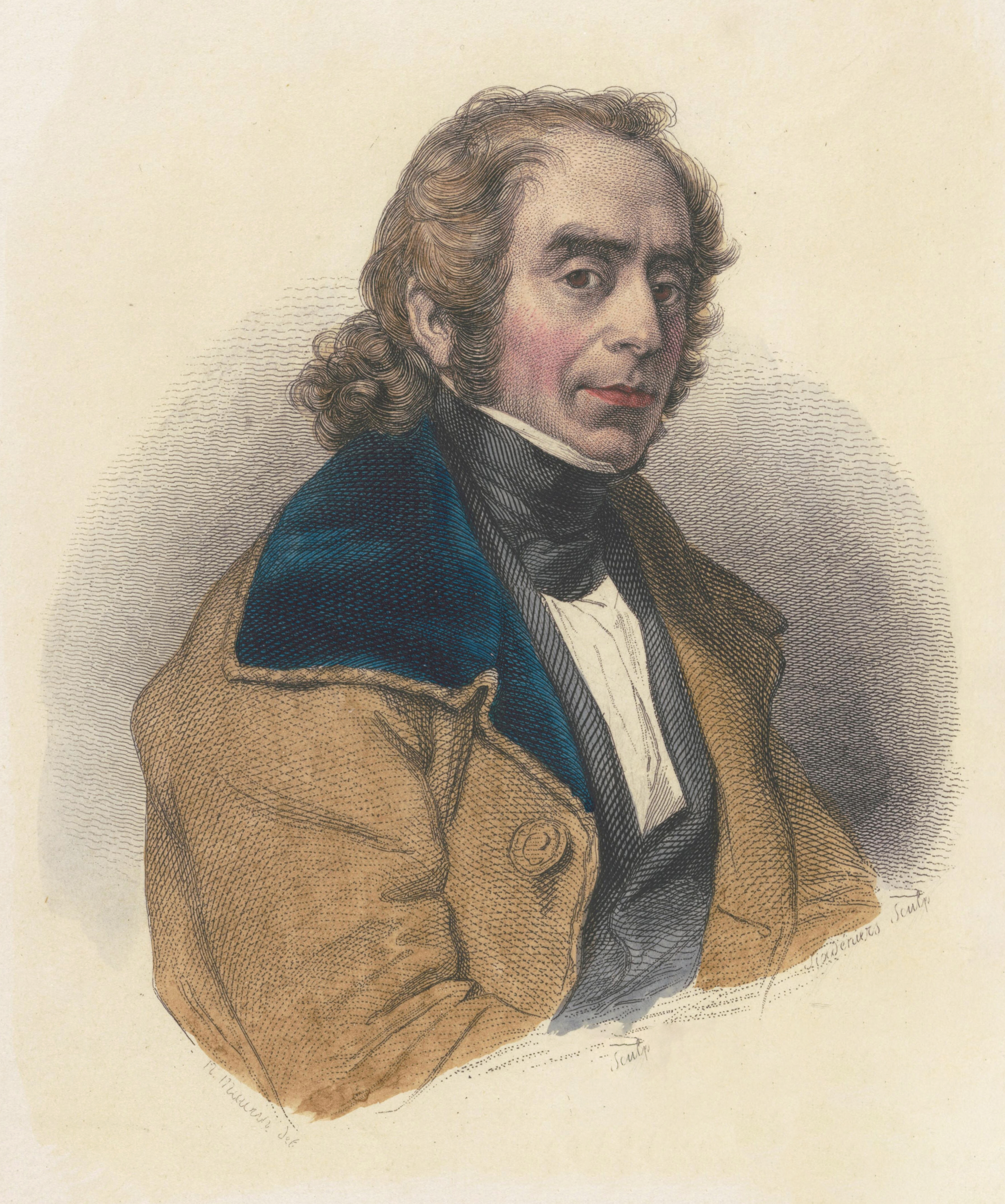
Jacques Arago

Meanwhile, Verne was spending much time at the Bibliothèque nationale de France, conducting research for his stories and feeding his passion for science and recent discoveries, especially in geography. It was in this period that Verne met the illustrious geographer and explorer Jacques Arago, who continued to travel extensively despite his blindness (he had lost his sight completely in 1837). The two men became good friends, and Arago's innovative and witty accounts of his travels led Verne toward a newly developing genre of literature: that of travel writing.

In 1852, two new pieces from Verne appeared in the Musée des familles: Martin Paz, a novella set in Lima, which Verne wrote in 1851 and published 10 July through 11 August 1852, and Les Châteaux en Californie, ou, Pierre qui roule n'amasse pas mousse (The Castles in California, or, A Rolling Stone Gathers No Moss), a one-act comedy full of racy double entendres. In April and May 1854, the magazine published Verne's short story Master Zacharius, an E. T. A. Hoffmann-like fantasy featuring a sharp condemnation of scientific hubris and ambition, followed soon afterward by A Winter Amid the Ice, a polar adventure story whose themes closely anticipated many of Verne's novels. The Musée also published some nonfiction popular science articles which, though unsigned, are generally attributed to Verne. Verne's work for the magazine was cut short in 1856 when he had a serious quarrel with Pitre-Chevalier and refused to continue contributing (a refusal he would maintain until 1863, when Pitre-Chevalier died, and the magazine went to new editorship).

While writing stories and articles for Pitre-Chevalier, Verne began to form the idea of inventing a new kind of novel, a "Roman de la Science" ("novel of science"), which would allow him to incorporate large amounts of the factual information he so enjoyed researching in the Bibliothèque. He is said to have discussed the project with the elder Alexandre Dumas, who had tried something similar with an unfinished novel, Isaac Laquedem, and who enthusiastically encouraged Verne's project.

At the end of 1854, another outbreak of cholera led to the death of Jules Seveste, Verne's employer at the Théâtre Lyrique and by then a good friend. Though his contract only held him to a further year of service, Verne remained connected to the theater for several years after Seveste's death, seeing additional productions to fruition. He also continued to write plays and musical comedies, most of which were not performed.

=== Family ===
In May 1856, Verne travelled to Amiens to be the best man at the wedding of a Nantes friend, Auguste Lelarge, to an Amiens woman named Aimée du Fraysne de Viane. Verne, invited to stay with the bride's family, took to them warmly, befriending the entire household and finding himself increasingly attracted to the bride's sister, Honorine Anne Hébée Morel (née du Fraysne de Viane), a widow aged 26 with two young children. Hoping to find a secure source of income, as well as a chance to court Morel in earnest, he jumped at her brother's offer to go into business with a broker. Verne's father was initially dubious but gave in to his son's requests for approval in November 1856. With his financial situation finally looking promising, Verne won the favor of Morel and her family, and the couple were married on 10 January 1857.

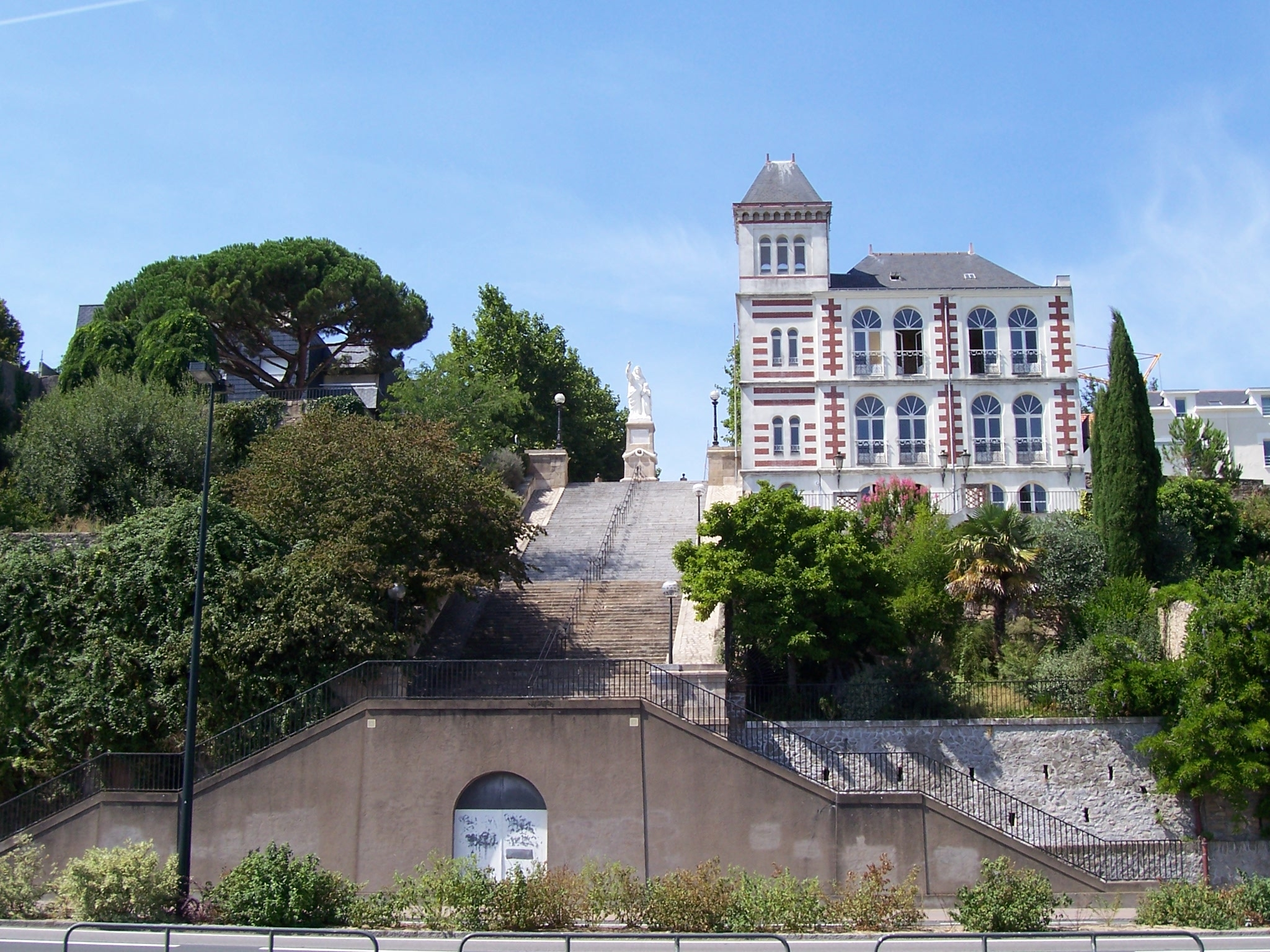
Jules Verne Museum, Butte Saint-Anne, Nantes, France

Verne plunged into his new business obligations, leaving his work at the Théâtre Lyrique and taking up a full-time job as an agent de change on the Paris Bourse, where he became the associate of the broker Fernand Eggly. Verne woke up early each morning so that he would have time to write, before going to the Bourse for the day's work; in the rest of his spare time, he continued to consort with the Onze-Sans-Femme club (all eleven of its "bachelors" had by this time married). He also continued to frequent the Bibliothèque to do scientific and historical research, much of which he copied onto notecards for future use—a system he would continue for the rest of his life. According to the recollections of a colleague, Verne "did better in repartee than in business".

In July 1858, Verne and Aristide Hignard seized an opportunity offered by Hignard's brother: a sea voyage, at no charge, from Bordeaux to Liverpool and Scotland. The journey, Verne's first trip outside France, deeply impressed him, and upon his return to Paris he fictionalized his recollections to form the backbone of a semi-autobiographical novel, Backwards to Britain (written in the autumn and winter of 1859–1860 and not published until 1989). A second complimentary voyage in 1861 took Hignard and Verne to Stockholm, from where they traveled to Christiania and through Telemark. Verne left Hignard in Denmark to return in haste to Paris, but missed the birth on 3 August 1861 of his only biological son, Michel.

Meanwhile, Verne continued work on the idea of a "Roman de la Science", which he developed in a rough draft, inspired, according to his recollections, by his "love for maps and the great explorers of the world". It took shape as a story of travel across Africa and would eventually become his first published novel, Five Weeks in a Balloon.

=== Hetzel ===
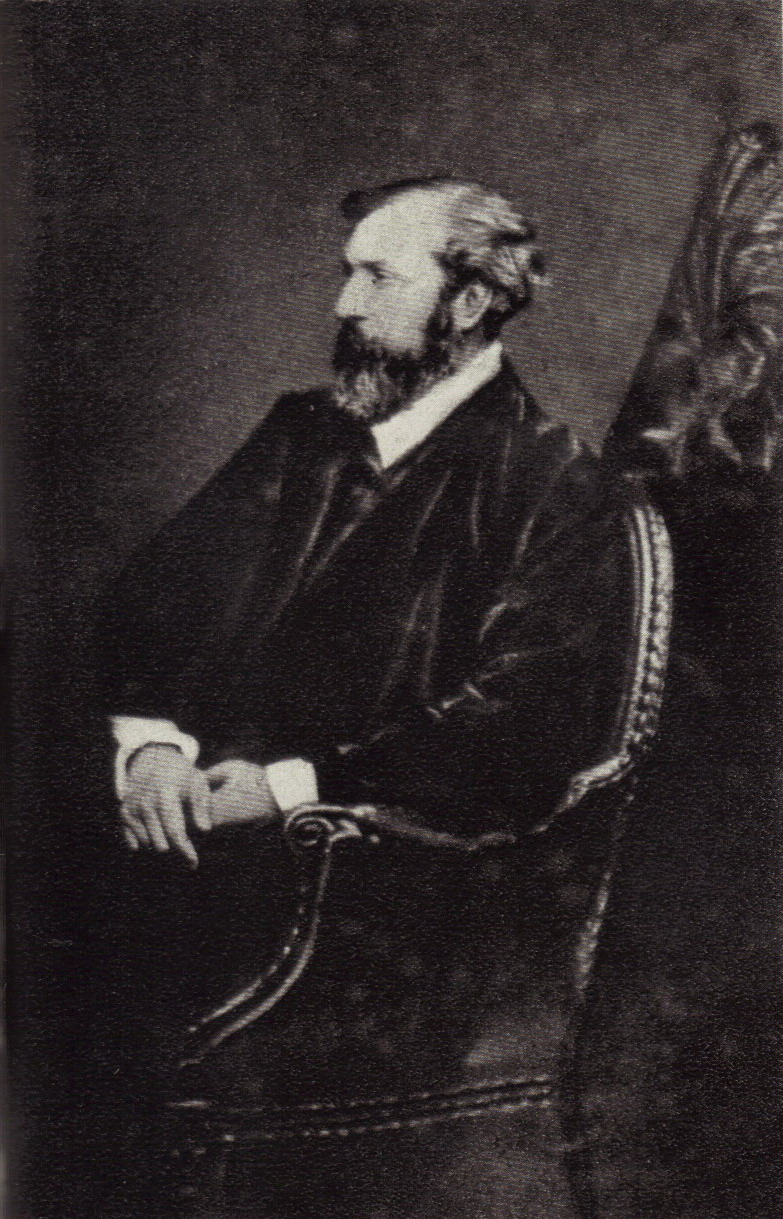
Pierre-Jules Hetzel

In 1862, through their mutual acquaintance Alfred de Bréhat, Verne came into contact with the publisher Pierre-Jules Hetzel, and submitted to him the manuscript of his developing novel, then called Voyage en Ballon. Hetzel, already the publisher of Honoré de Balzac, George Sand, Victor Hugo, and other well-known authors, had long been planning to launch a high-quality family magazine in which entertaining fiction would combine with scientific education. He saw Verne, with his demonstrated inclination toward scrupulously researched adventure stories, as an ideal contributor for such a magazine, and accepted the novel, giving Verne suggestions for improvement. Verne made the proposed revisions within two weeks and returned to Hetzel with the final draft, now titled Five Weeks in a Balloon. It was published by Hetzel on 31 January 1863.

To secure his services for the planned magazine, to be called the Magasin d'Éducation et de Récréation (Magazine of Education and Recreation), Hetzel also drew up a long-term contract in which Verne would give him three volumes of text per year, each of which Hetzel would buy outright for a flat fee. Verne, finding both a steady salary and a sure outlet for writing at last, accepted immediately. For the rest of his lifetime, most of his novels would be serialized in Hetzel's Magasin before their appearance in book form, beginning with his second novel for Hetzel, The Adventures of Captain Hatteras (1864–65).

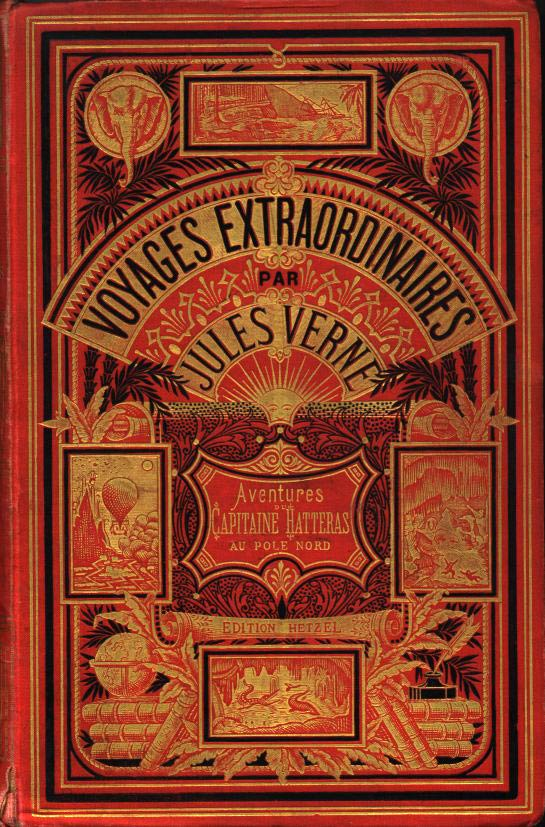
A Hetzel edition of Verne's The Adventures of Captain Hatteras (cover style "Aux deux éléphants")

When The Adventures of Captain Hatteras was published in book form in 1866, Hetzel publicly announced his literary and educational ambitions for Verne's novels by saying in a preface that Verne's works would form a novel sequence called the Voyages extraordinaires (Extraordinary Voyages or Extraordinary Journeys), and that Verne's aim was "to outline all the geographical, geological, physical, and astronomical knowledge amassed by modern science and to recount, in an entertaining and picturesque format that is his own, the history of the universe". Late in life, Verne confirmed that this commission had become the running theme of his novels: "My object has been to depict the earth, and not the earth alone, but the universe... And I have tried at the same time to realize a very high ideal of beauty of style. It is said that there can't be any style in a novel of adventure, but it isn't true." However, he also noted that the project was extremely ambitious: "Yes! But the Earth is very large, and life is very short! In order to leave a completed work behind, one would need to live to be at least 100 years old!"

Hetzel influenced many of Verne's novels directly, especially in the first few years of their collaboration, for Verne was initially so happy to find a publisher that he agreed to almost all of the changes Hetzel suggested. For example, when Hetzel disapproved of the original climax of Captain Hatteras, including the death of the title character, Verne wrote an entirely new conclusion in which Hatteras survived. Hetzel also rejected Verne's next submission, Paris in the Twentieth Century, believing its pessimistic view of the future and its condemnation of technological progress were too subversive for a family magazine. (The manuscript, believed lost for some time after Verne's death, was finally published in 1994.)

The relationship between publisher and writer changed significantly around 1869 when Verne and Hetzel were brought into conflict over the manuscript for Twenty Thousand Leagues Under the Seas. Verne had initially conceived of the submariner Captain Nemo as a Polish scientist whose acts of vengeance were directed against the Russians who had killed his family during the January Uprising. Hetzel, not wanting to alienate the lucrative Russian market for Verne's books, demanded that Nemo be made an enemy of the slave trade, a situation that would make him an unambiguous hero. Verne, after fighting vehemently against the change, finally invented a compromise in which Nemo's past is left mysterious. After this disagreement, Verne became notably cooler in his dealings with Hetzel, taking suggestions into consideration but often rejecting them outright.

From that point, Verne published two or more volumes a year. The most successful of these are: Voyage au centre de la Terre (Journey to the Center of the Earth, 1864); De la Terre à la Lune (From the Earth to the Moon, 1865); Vingt mille lieues sous les mers (Twenty Thousand Leagues Under the Seas, 1869); and Le tour du monde en quatre-vingts jours (Around the World in Eighty Days), which first appeared in Le Temps in 1872. Verne could now live on his writings, but most of his wealth came from the stage adaptations of Le tour du monde en quatre-vingts jours (1874) and Michel Strogoff (1876), which he wrote with Adolphe d'Ennery.

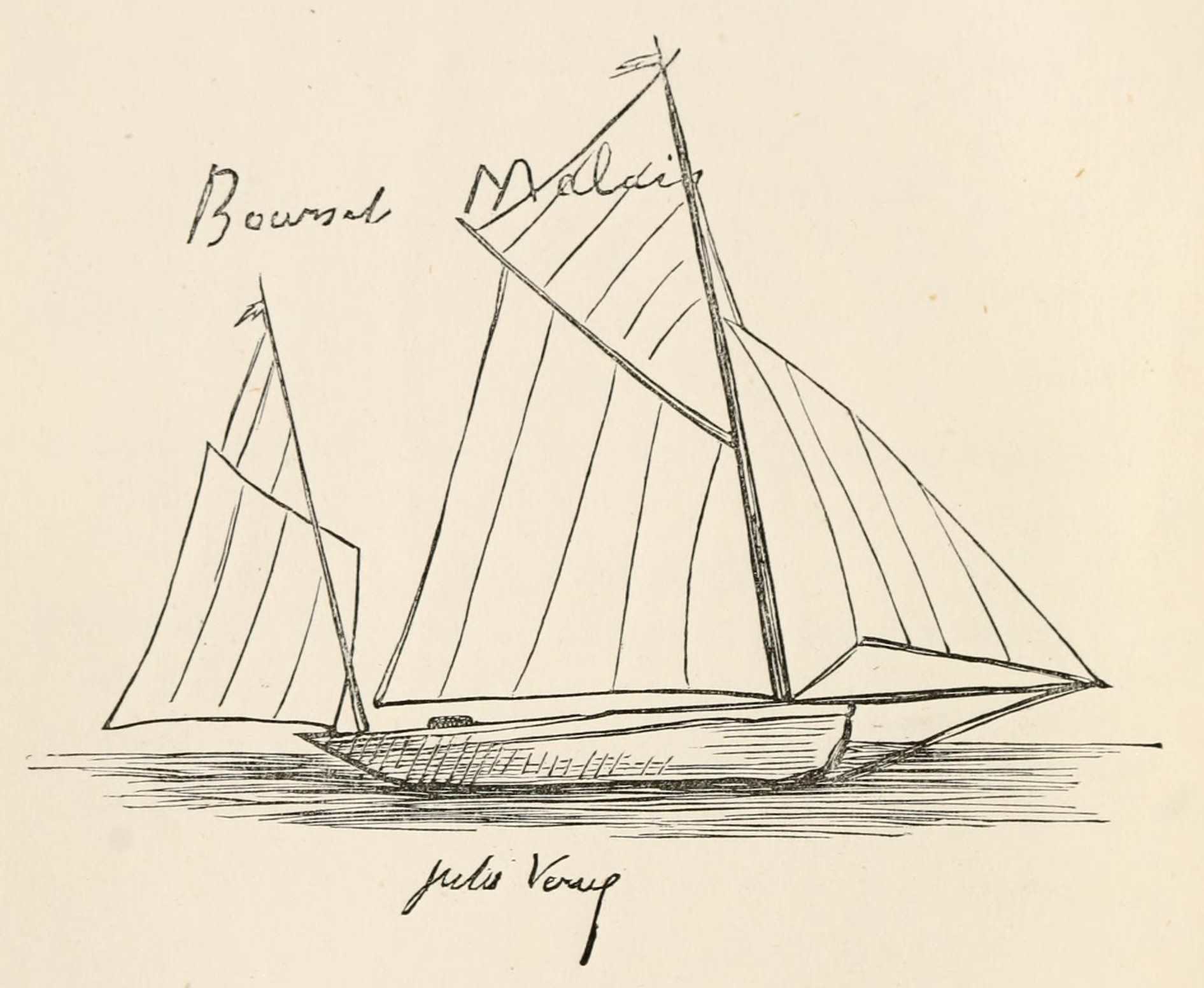
Sketch by Verne of the Saint-Michel

In 1867, Verne bought a small boat, the Saint-Michel, which he successively replaced with the Saint-Michel II and the Saint-Michel III as his financial situation improved. On board the Saint-Michel III, he sailed around Europe. After his first novel, most of his stories were first serialised in the Magazine d'Éducation et de Récréation, a Hetzel biweekly publication, before being published in book form. His brother Paul contributed to 40th French climbing of the Mont-Blanc and a collection of short stories – Doctor Ox – in 1874. Verne became wealthy and famous.

Meanwhile, Michel Verne married an actress against his father's wishes, had two children by an underage mistress and buried himself in debts. The relationship between father and son improved as Michel grew older.

=== Later years ===
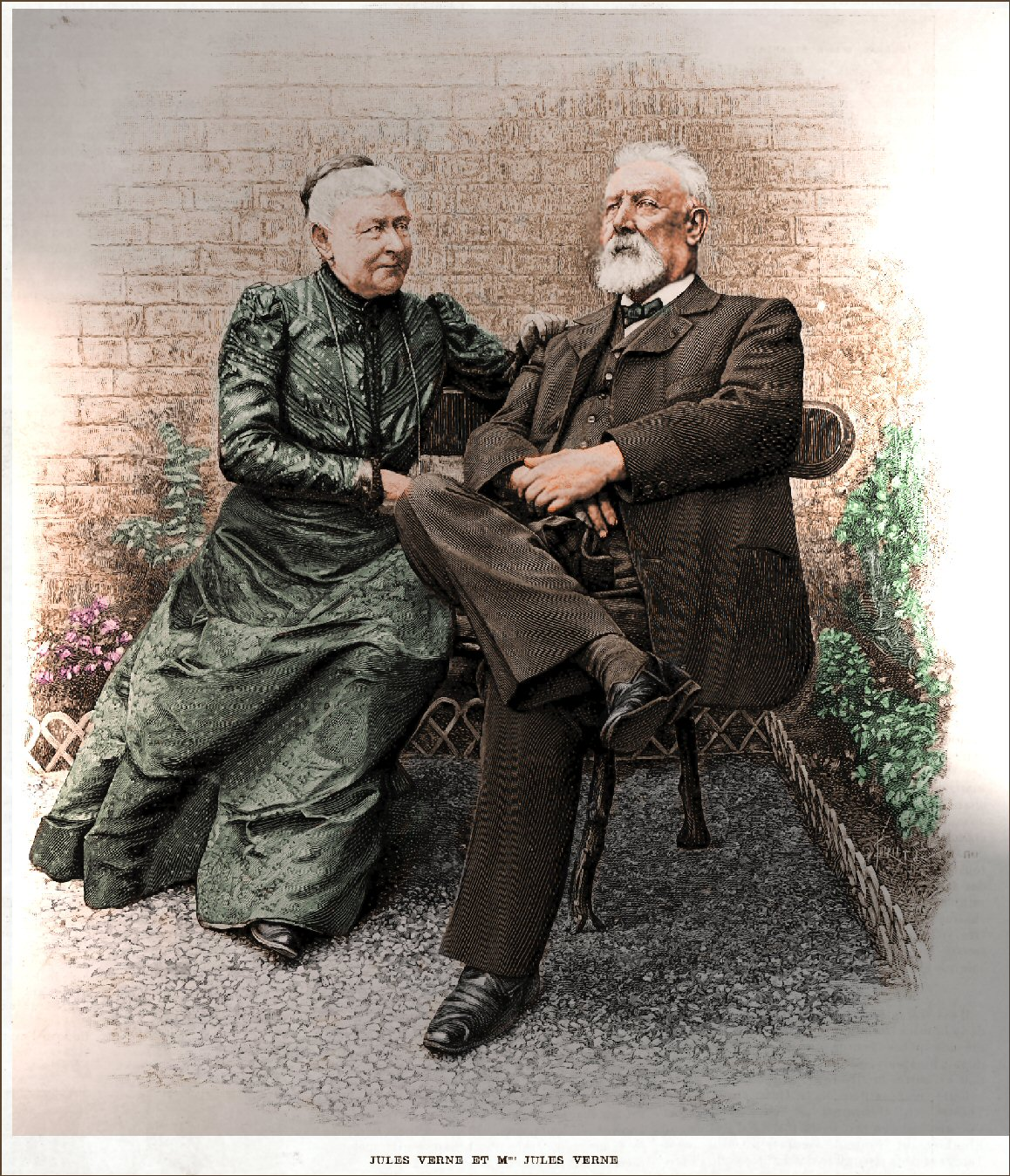
Jules Verne and Madame Verne c. 1900

Though raised as a Catholic, Verne gravitated towards deism. Some scholars believe his novels reflect a deist philosophy, as they often involve the notion of God or divine providence but rarely mention the concept of Christ.

On 9 March 1886, as Verne returned home, his twenty-six-year-old nephew, Gaston, shot at him twice with a pistol. The first bullet missed, but the second one entered Verne's left leg, giving him a permanent limp that could not be overcome. This incident was not publicised in the media, but Gaston spent the rest of his life in a mental asylum.

After the deaths of both his mother and Hetzel (who died in 1886), Jules Verne began publishing darker works. In 1888 he entered politics and was elected town councillor of Amiens, where he championed several improvements during the fifteen years he served in office.

Verne was made a knight of France's Legion of Honour on 9 April 1870, and subsequently promoted in Legion of Honour rank to Officer on 19 July 1892.

=== Death and posthumous publications ===
On 24 March 1905, while ill with chronic diabetes and complications from a stroke which paralyzed his right side, Verne died at his home in Amiens, 44 Boulevard Longueville (now Boulevard Jules-Verne). His son, Michel Verne, oversaw the publication of the novels Invasion of the Sea and The Lighthouse at the End of the World after Jules's death. The Voyages extraordinaires series continued for several years afterwards at the same rate of two volumes a year. It was later discovered that Michel Verne had made extensive changes in these stories, and the original versions were eventually published at the end of the 20th century by the Jules Verne Society (Société Jules Verne). In 1919, Michel Verne published The Barsac Mission (French: L'Étonnante Aventure de la Mission Barsac), whose original drafts contained references to Esperanto, a language that his father had been very interested in. In 1989, Verne's great-grandson discovered his ancestor's as-yet-unpublished novel Paris in the Twentieth Century, which was subsequently published in 1994.

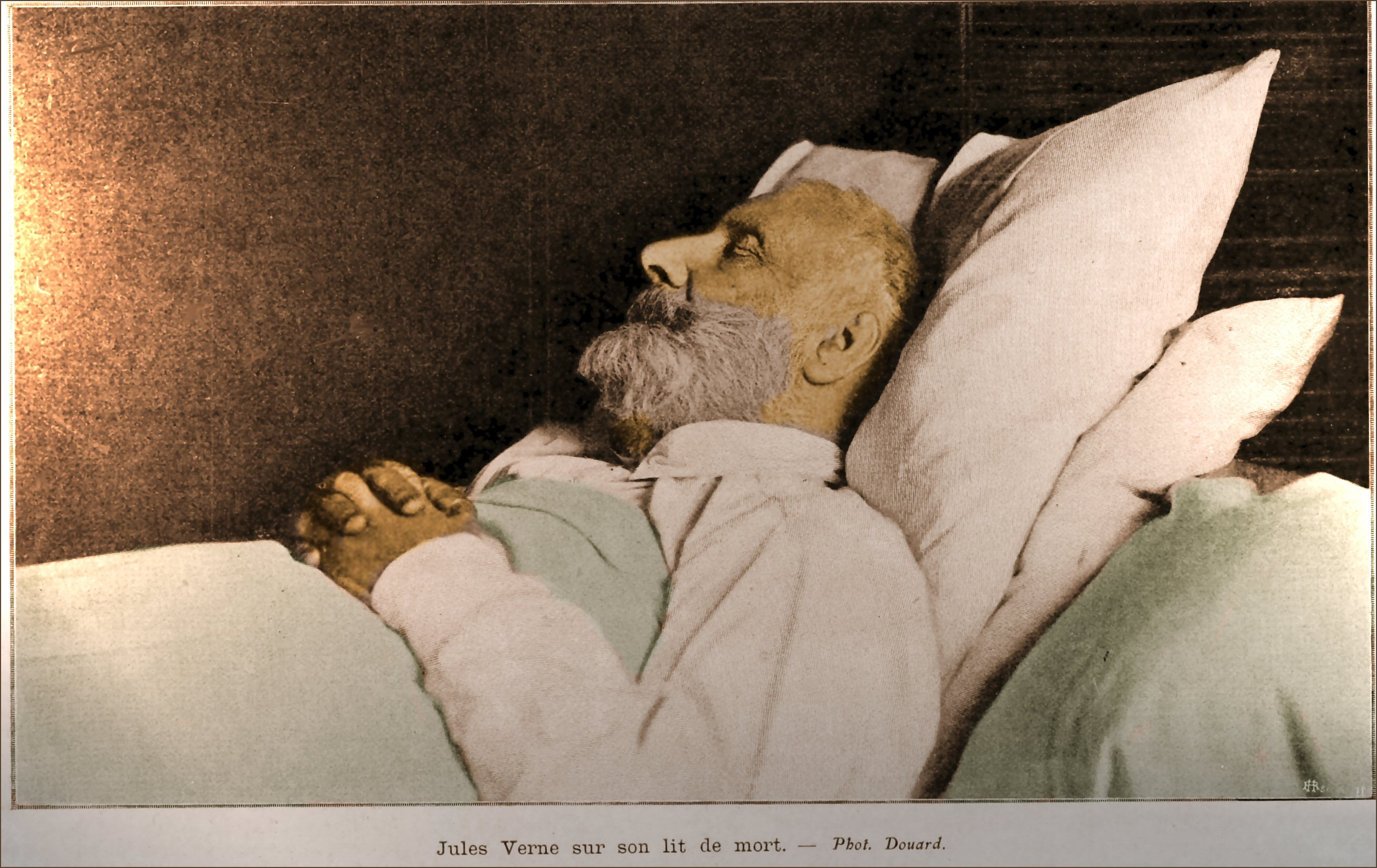
Jules Verne on his deathbed

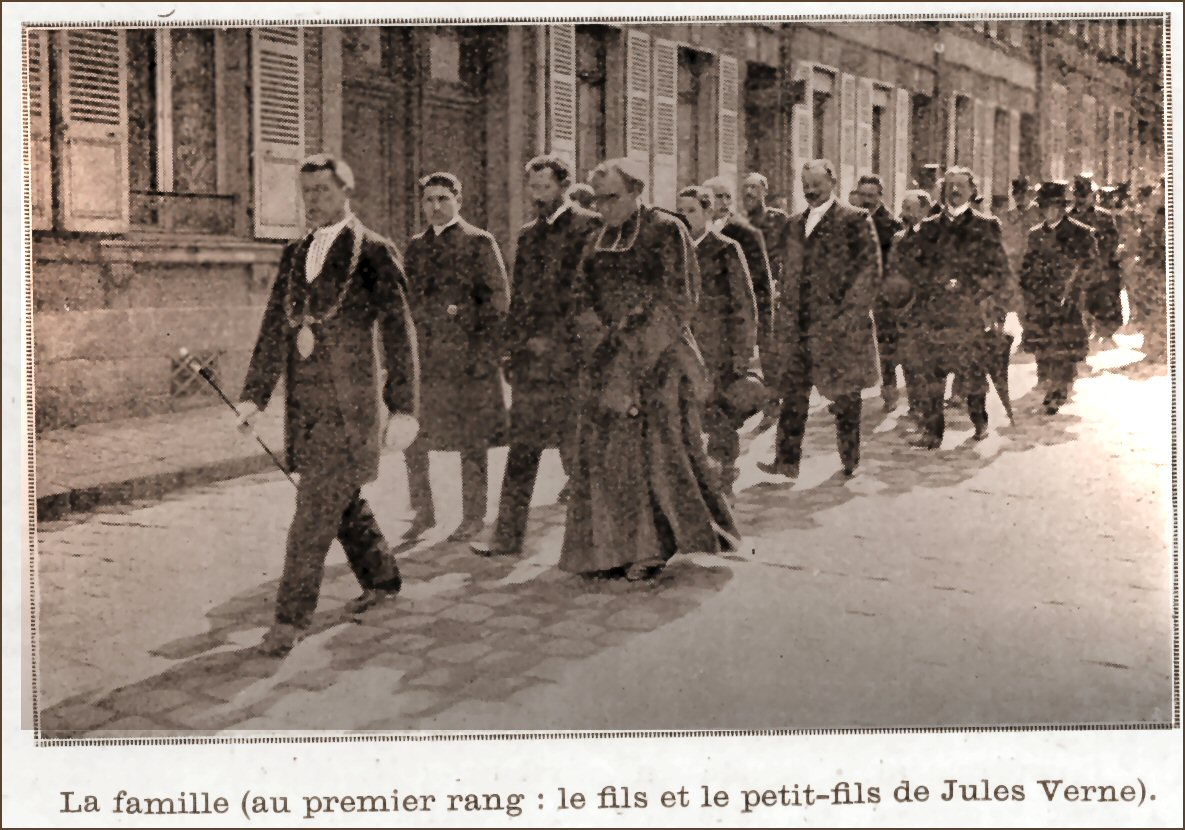
Verne's funeral procession, headed by his son and grandson

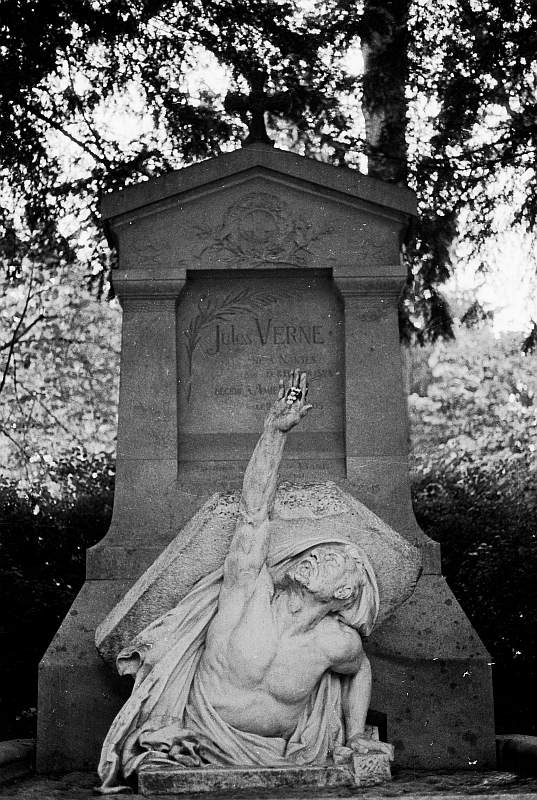
Verne's tomb in Amiens

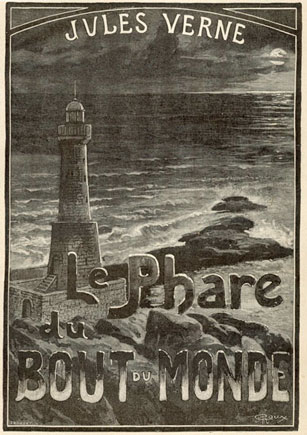
The Lighthouse at the End of the World is considered one of the best novels of Verne's literary stage.

== Works ==
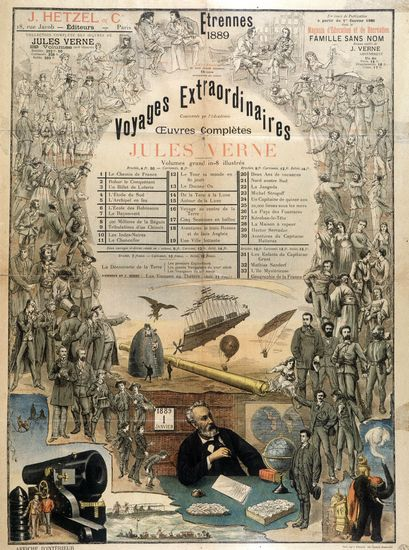
An 1889 Hetzel poster advertising Verne's works

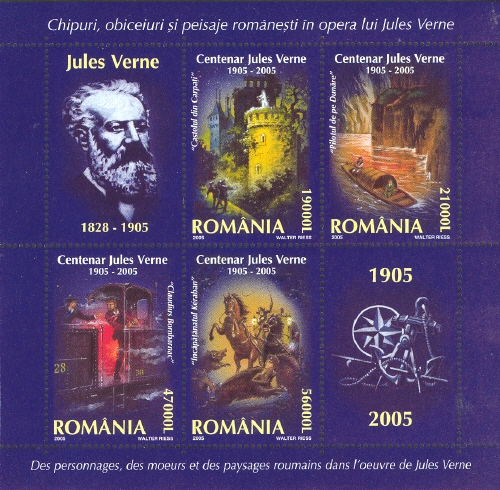
Verne novels, The Carpathian Castle, The Danube Pilot, Claudius Bombarnac, and Kéraban the Inflexible, on a miniature sheet of Romanian postage stamps (2005)

Verne's largest body of work is the Voyages extraordinaires series, which includes all of his novels except for the two rejected manuscripts Paris in the Twentieth Century and Backwards to Britain (published posthumously in 1994 and 1989, respectively) and for projects left unfinished at his death (many of which would be posthumously adapted or rewritten for publication by his son Michel). Verne also wrote many plays, poems, song texts, operetta libretti, and short stories, as well as a variety of essays and miscellaneous non-fiction.

=== Literary reception ===
After his debut under Hetzel, Verne was enthusiastically received in France by writers and scientists alike, with George Sand and Théophile Gautier among his earliest admirers. Several notable contemporary figures, from the geographer Vivien de Saint-Martin to the critic Jules Claretie, spoke highly of Verne and his works in critical and biographical notes.

However, Verne's growing popularity among readers and playgoers (due especially to the highly successful stage version of Around the World in Eighty Days) led to a gradual change in his literary reputation. As the novels and stage productions continued to sell, many contemporary critics felt that Verne's status as a commercially popular author meant he could only be seen as a mere genre-based storyteller, rather than a serious author worthy of academic study.

This denial of formal literary status took various forms, including dismissive criticism by such writers as Émile Zola and the lack of Verne's nomination for membership in the Académie Française, and was recognized by Verne himself, who said in a late interview: "The great regret of my life is that I have never taken any place in French literature." To Verne, who considered himself "a man of letters and an artist, living in the pursuit of the ideal", this critical dismissal on the basis of literary ideology could only be seen as the ultimate snub.

This bifurcation of Verne as a popular genre writer but a critical persona non grata continued after his death, with early biographies (including one by Verne's own niece, Marguerite Allotte de la Fuÿe) focusing on error-filled and embroidered hagiography of Verne as a popular figure rather than on Verne's actual working methods or his output. Meanwhile, sales of Verne's novels in their original unabridged versions dropped markedly even in Verne's home country, with abridged versions aimed directly at children taking their place.

However, the decades after Verne's death also saw the rise in France of the "Jules Verne cult", a steadily growing group of scholars and young writers who took Verne's works seriously as literature and willingly noted his influence on their own pioneering works. Some of the cult founded the Société Jules Verne, the first academic society for Verne scholars; many others became highly respected avant garde and surrealist literary figures in their own right. Their praise and analyses, emphasizing Verne's stylistic innovations and enduring literary themes, proved highly influential for literary studies to come.

In the 1960s and 1970s, thanks in large part to a sustained wave of serious literary study from well-known French scholars and writers, Verne's reputation skyrocketed in France. Roland Barthes' seminal essay Nautilus et Bateau Ivre (The Nautilus and the Drunken Boat) was influential in its exegesis of the Voyages extraordinares as a purely literary text, while book-length studies by such figures as Marcel Moré and Jean Chesneaux considered Verne from a multitude of thematic vantage points.

French literary journals devoted entire issues to Verne and his work, with essays by such imposing literary figures as Michel Butor, Georges Borgeaud, Marcel Brion, Pierre Versins, Michel Foucault, René Barjavel, Marcel Lecomte, Francis Lacassin, and Michel Serres; meanwhile, Verne's entire published opus returned to print, with unabridged and illustrated editions of his works printed by Livre de Poche and Éditions Rencontre. The wave reached its climax in Verne's sesquicentennial year 1978, when he was made the subject of an academic colloquium at the Centre culturel international de Cerisy-la-Salle, and Journey to the Center of the Earth was accepted for the French university system's agrégation reading list. Since these events, Verne has been consistently recognized in Europe as a legitimate member of the French literary canon, with academic studies and new publications steadily continuing.

Verne's reputation in English-speaking countries has been considerably slower in changing. Throughout the 20th century, most anglophone scholars dismissed Verne as a genre writer for children and a naïve proponent of science and technology (despite strong evidence to the contrary on both counts), thus finding him more interesting as a technological prophet or as a subject of comparison to English-language writers such as Edgar Allan Poe and H. G. Wells than as a topic of literary study in his own right. This narrow view of Verne has undoubtedly been influenced by the poor-quality English translations and very loosely adapted Hollywood film versions through which most American and British readers have discovered Verne. However, since the mid-1980s a considerable number of serious English-language studies and translations have appeared, suggesting that a rehabilitation of Verne's anglophone reputation may currently be underway.

=== English translations ===
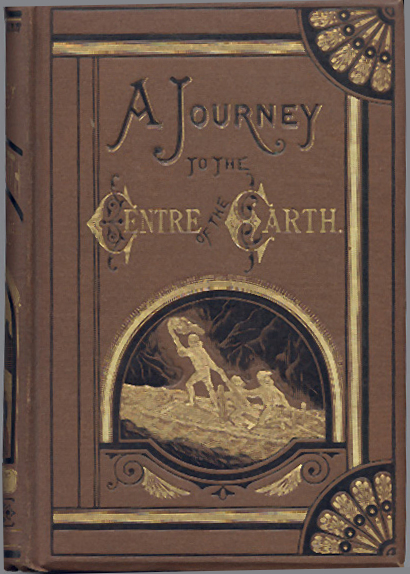
An early edition of the notorious Griffith & Farran adaptation of Journey to the Center of the Earth

Translation of Verne into English began in 1852, when Verne's short story A Voyage in a Balloon (1851) was published in the American journal Sartain's Union Magazine of Literature and Art in a translation by Anne T. Wilbur. Translation of his novels began in 1869 with William Lackland's translation of Five Weeks in a Balloon (originally published in 1863), and continued steadily throughout Verne's lifetime, with publishers and hired translators often working in great haste to rush his most lucrative titles into English-language print. Unlike Hetzel, who targeted all ages with his publishing strategies for the Voyages extraordinaires, the British and American publishers of Verne chose to market his books almost exclusively to young audiences; this business move had a long-lasting effect on Verne's reputation in English-speaking countries, implying that Verne could be treated purely as a children's author.

These early English-language translations have been widely criticized for their extensive textual omissions, errors, and alterations, and are not considered adequate representations of Verne's actual novels. In an essay for The Guardian, British writer Adam Roberts commented:

I'd always liked reading Jules Verne and I've read most of his novels; but it wasn't until recently that I really understood I hadn't been reading Jules Verne at all ... It's a bizarre situation for a world-famous writer to be in. Indeed, I can't think of a major writer who has been so poorly served by translation.

Similarly, the American novelist Michael Crichton observed:

Verne's prose is lean and fast-moving in a peculiarly modern way ... [but] Verne has been particularly ill-served by his English translators. At best they have provided us with clunky, choppy, tone-deaf prose. At worst – as in the notorious 1872 "translation" [of Journey to the Center of the Earth] published by Griffith & Farran – they have blithely altered the text, giving Verne's characters new names, and adding whole pages of their own invention, thus effectively obliterating the meaning and tone of Verne's original.

Since 1965, a considerable number of more accurate English translations of Verne have appeared. However, the older, deficient translations continue to be republished due to their public domain status, and in many cases their easy availability in online sources.

=== Relationship with science fiction ===
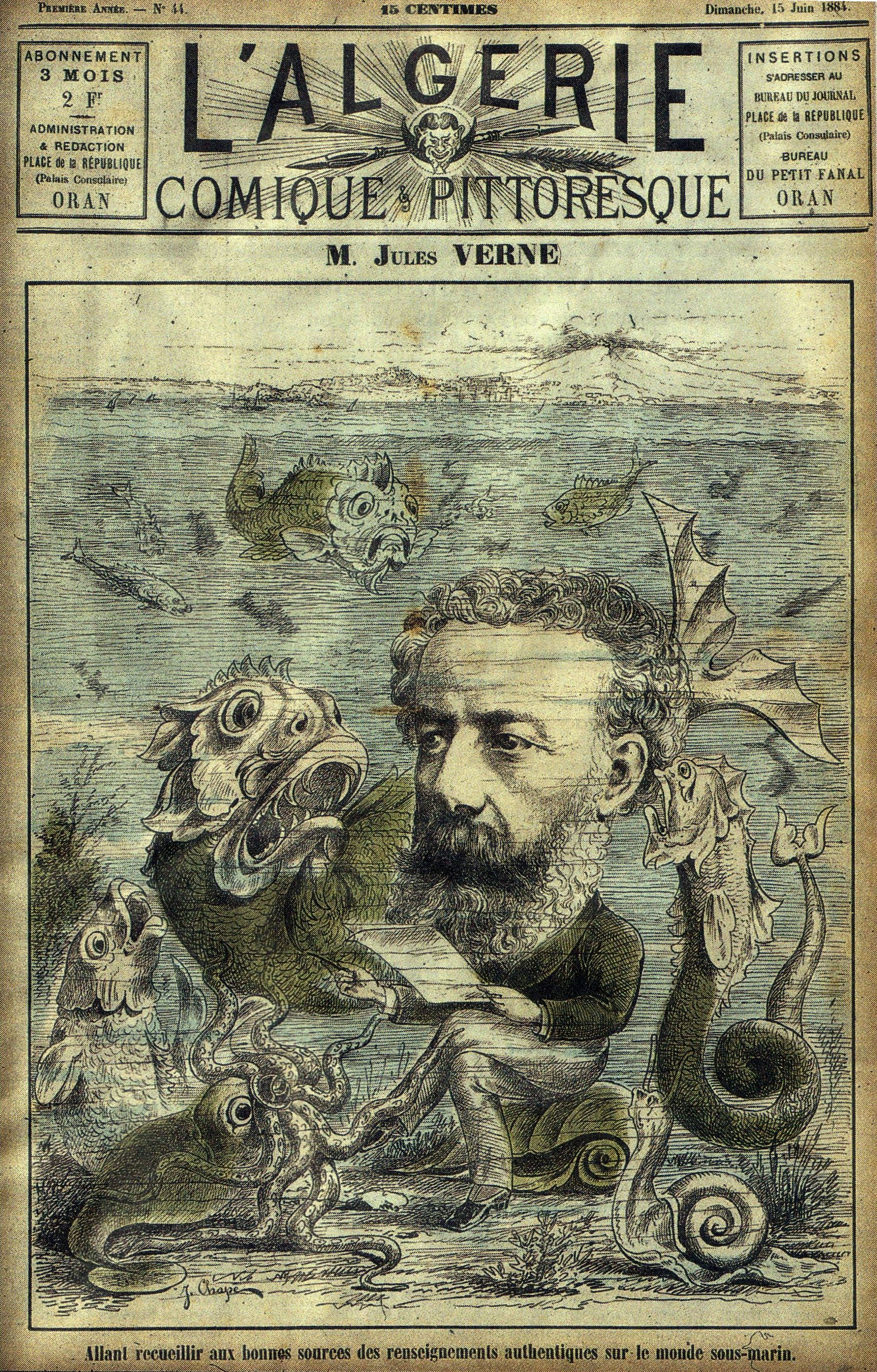
Caricature of Verne with fantastic sea life (1884)

The relationship between Verne's Voyages extraordinaires and the literary genre science fiction is a complex one. Verne, like H. G. Wells, is frequently cited as one of the founders of the genre, and his profound influence on its development is indisputable; however, many earlier writers, such as Lucian of Samosata, Voltaire, and Mary Shelley, have also been cited as creators of science fiction, an unavoidable ambiguity arising from the vague definition and history of the genre.

A primary issue at the heart of the dispute is the question of whether Verne's works count as science fiction to begin with. Maurice Renard claimed that Verne "never wrote a single sentence of scientific-marvelous". Verne himself argued repeatedly in interviews that his novels were not meant to be read as scientific, saying "I have invented nothing". His own goal was rather to "depict the earth [and] at the same time to realize a very high ideal of beauty of style", as he pointed out in an example:

I wrote Five Weeks in a Balloon, not as a story about ballooning, but as a story about Africa. I always was greatly interested in geography, history and travel, and I wanted to give a romantic description of Africa. Now, there was no means of taking my travellers through Africa otherwise than in a balloon, and that is why a balloon is introduced.... I may say that at the time I wrote the novel, as now, I had no faith in the possibility of ever steering balloons...

Closely related to Verne's science-fiction reputation is the often-repeated claim that he is a "prophet" of scientific progress, and that many of his novels involve elements of technology that were fantastic for his day but later became commonplace. These claims have a long history, especially in America, but the modern scholarly consensus is that such claims of prophecy are heavily exaggerated. In a 1961 article critical of Twenty Thousand Leagues Under the Seas' scientific accuracy, Theodore L. Thomas speculated that Verne's storytelling skill and readers' faulty memories of a book they read as children caused people to "remember things from it that are not there. The impression that the novel contains valid scientific prediction seems to grow as the years roll by". As with science fiction, Verne himself flatly denied that he was a futuristic prophet, saying that any connection between scientific developments and his work was "mere coincidence" and attributing his indisputable scientific accuracy to his extensive research: "even before I began writing stories, I always took numerous notes out of every book, newspaper, magazine, or scientific report that I came across."

== Legacy ==
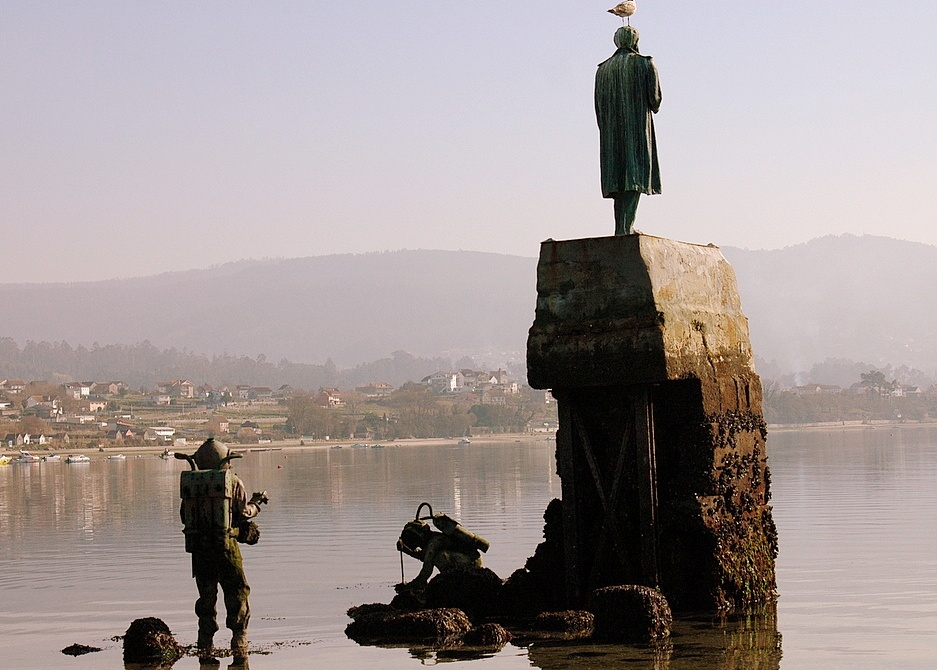
Monument to Verne in Redondela, Spain

Verne's novels have had a wide influence on both literary and scientific works; writers known to have been influenced by Verne include Marcel Aymé, Roland Barthes, René Barjavel, Michel Butor, Blaise Cendrars, Paul Claudel, Jean Cocteau, Julio Cortázar, François Mauriac, Rick Riordan, Raymond Roussel, Claude Roy, Antoine de Saint-Exupéry, and Jean-Paul Sartre, while scientists and explorers who acknowledged Verne's inspiration have included Richard E. Byrd, Yuri Gagarin, Simon Lake, Hubert Lyautey, Guglielmo Marconi, Fridtjof Nansen, Konstantin Tsiolkovsky, Wernher von Braun, and Jack Parsons. Verne is credited with helping inspire the steampunk genre, a literary and social movement that glamorizes science fiction based on 19th-century technology.

Ray Bradbury summarized Verne's influence on literature and the science world: "We are all, in one way or another, the children of Jules Verne."

The highest trim level of the French luxury vehicle manufacturer DS's cars, is named the Jules Verne Edition, to honour the figure as an integral part of French cultural heritage and history.

Verne has also been mentioned during human missions to the Moon ; during the return flight of the Apollo 11 crew in 1969 and at splashdown of the Artemis II, the first crewed flight beyond low Earth orbit since Apollo 17 in 1972. During their return journey from the Moon, the crew of Apollo 11 made reference to Jules Verne's book during a TV broadcast on 23 July 1969. The mission's commander, astronaut Neil Armstrong, said, "A hundred years ago, Jules Verne wrote a book about a voyage to the Moon. His spaceship, Columbia [sic], took off from Florida and landed in the Pacific Ocean after completing a trip to the Moon. It seems appropriate to us to share with you some of the reflections of the crew as the modern-day Columbia completes its rendezvous with the planet Earth and the same Pacific Ocean tomorrow."

In 2026, upon the splashdown return of Artemis II from the historic lunar flyby around the Moon back to Earth and the first test flight of Orion (spacecraft) with crew members; NASA Public Affairs Officer and commentator Rob Navias (also known as the 'Voice of NASA') made reference to Verne, stating "Splashdown confirmed at 7:07 pm Central Time, 5:07 pm Pacific Time, from the pages of Jules Verne to a modern day mission to the moon, a new chapter of the exploration of our celestial neighbour is complete". This was during the official live broadcast of the landing shown by NASA on YouTube.

== See also ==
- List of Legion of Honour recipients by name (V)
- Legion of Honour Museum
- Scientific Marvelous

== General sources ==
- Allotte de la Fuÿe, Marguerite (1956), Jules Verne, sa vie, son oeuvre, translated by Erik de Mauny, New York: Coward-McCann
- Angenot, Marc (Spring 1973), "Jules Verne and French Literary Criticism", Science Fiction Studies, I (1): 33–37, doi:10.1525/sfs.1.1.0033, archived from the original on 13 July 2001
- Angenot, Marc (March 1976), "Jules Verne and French Literary Criticism (II)", Science Fiction Studies, III (8): 46–49, doi:10.1525/sfs.3.1.0046, archived from the original on 13 July 2001
- Belloc, Marie A. (February 1895), "Jules Verne at Home", Strand Magazine, archived from the original on 29 August 2000
- Butcher, William (1983), Jules Verne, Prophet or Poet?, Paris: Publications de l'INSEE
- Butcher, William (2006), Jules Verne: The Definitive Biography, New York: Thunder's Mouth Press
- Butcher, William (2007), "A Chronology of Jules Verne", Jules Verne Collection, Zvi Har'El, archived from the original on 19 June 2000
- Chelebourg, Christian (1986), "Le blanc et le noir. Amour et mort dans les 'Voyages extraordinaires'", Bulletin de la Société Jules Verne, 77: 22–30
- Compère, Cecile (1997a), "Jules Verne de Nantes", Revue Jules Verne, 4: 11–24
- Compère, Cecile (1997b), "Les vacances", Revue Jules Verne, 4: 33–36
- Compère, Cecile (1997c), "Le Paris de Jules Verne", Revue Jules Verne, 4: 41–54
- Costello, Peter (1978), Jules Verne, Inventor of Science Fiction, New York: Scribner
- Dehs, Volker; Margot, Jean-Michel; Har'El, Zvi (2007), "The Complete Jules Verne Bibliography", Jules Verne Collection, Zvi Har'El, archived from the original on 17 August 2000
- Dekiss, Jean-Paul; Dehs, Volker (1999), Jules Verne, l'enchanteur, Paris: Editions du Félin
- Dumas, Olivier (1988), Jules Verne: avec la publication de la correspondance inédite de Jules Verne à sa famille, Lyon: La Manufacture
- Dumas, Olivier (2000), Voyage à travers Jules Verne, Montreal: Stanke
- Evans, Arthur B. (1988), Jules Verne rediscovered: didacticism and the scientific novel, New York: Greenwood Press
- Evans, Arthur B. (March 1995), "The "New" Jules Verne", Science Fiction Studies, XXII:1 (65): 35–46, archived from the original on 26 September 2000
- Evans, Arthur B. (2000), "Jules Verne and the French Literary Canon", in Smyth, Edmund J. (ed.), Jules Verne: Narratives of Modernity, Liverpool: Liverpool University Press, pp. 11–39, archived from the original on 24 April 2002
- Evans, Arthur B. (March 2001), "Hetzel and Verne: Collaboration and Conflict", Science Fiction Studies, 1, XXVIII (83): 97–106, doi:10.1525/sfs.28.1.0097, archived from the original on 20 June 2002
- Evans, Arthur B. (March 2005a), "Jules Verne's English Translations", Science Fiction Studies, 1, XXXII (95): 80–104, archived from the original on 5 April 2006
- Evans, Arthur B. (March 2005b), "A Bibliography of Jules Verne's English Translations", Science Fiction Studies, 1, XXXII (95): 105–141, archived from the original on 7 March 2006
- Jules-Verne, Jean (1976), Jules Verne: a biography, translated by Roger Greaves, London: Macdonald and Jane's
- Lottmann, Herbert R. (1996), Jules Verne: an exploratory biography, New York: St. Martin's Press
- Margot, Jean-Michel (March 2005), "Jules Verne, playwright", Science Fiction Studies, 1, XXXII (95): 150–162, doi:10.1525/sfs.32.1.0150, archived from the original on 25 June 2007
- Martin, Charles-Noël (1973), "Les amours de jeunesse de Jules Verne", Bulletin de la Société Jules Verne, 28: 79–86
- Martin, Charles-Noël (1974), "Les amours de jeunesse de Jules Verne, 2e partie", Bulletin de la Société Jules Verne, 29: 103–113
- "Nantes et Jules Verne", Terres d'écrivains, L'association Terres d'écrivains, 28 August 2003
- Oliver, Kendrick (2012), To Touch the Face of God: The Sacred, the Profane, and the American Space Program, 1957–1975, Baltimore: JHU Press
- Pendle, George (2005), Strange Angel: The Otherworldly Life of Rocket Scientist John Whiteside Parsons, London: Weidenfeld & Nicolson, ISBN 978-0-7538-2065-0
- Percec, Dana, ed. (2014), Reading the Fantastic Imagination: The Avatars of a Literary Genre, Tyne, UK: Cambridge Scholars, ISBN 9781443862974
- Pérez, Ariel; de Vries, Garmt; Margot, Jean-Michel (2008), "Jules Verne FAQ", Jules Verne Collection, Zvi Har'El, archived from the original on 4 December 2001
- Sherard, Robert H. (January 1894), "Jules Verne at Home", McClure's Magazine, archived from the original on 29 August 2000
- Sherard, Robert H. (9 October 1903), "Jules Verne Re-visited", T.P.'s Weekly, archived from the original on 29 August 2000
- "Statistics: 'Top 50' Author", Index Translationum, UNESCO Culture Sector, 2013; statistics on Index Translationum database (1979–present, updates processed upon receipt from UNESCO members states)
- Teague, Gypsey Elaine (2013), Steampunk Magic: Working Magic Aboard the Airship, Weiser Books, ISBN 9781609258405
- Verne, Jules (1890), "Souvenirs d'enfance et de jeunesse", Jules Verne Collection, Zvi Har'El, archived from the original on 24 April 2003
- Verne, Jules (2000), "La sixieme ville de France", Le Tour de Verne en 80 Mots, Gilles Carpentier
- Verne, Jules (2007), Arthur B. Evans (ed.), The Kip Brothers, translated by Stanford Luce, Introduction and notes by Jean-Michel Margot., Middletown, CT: Wesleyan University Press
