= Mysterious Island (1941 film) =

Soviet adventure film adaptation

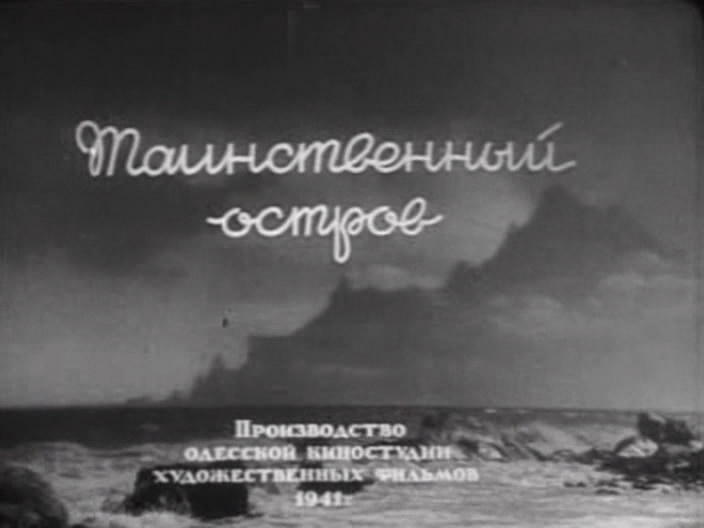
- Directed by: Eduard Pentslin
- Written by: Boris Shelontsev; Mikhail Kalinin
- Based on: The Mysterious Island; 1874 novel by Jules Verne
- Starring: Alexei Krasnopolsky; Pavel Kiyansky; Igor Kozlov
- Cinematography: Mikhail Belsky; Mikhail Karyukov
- Music by: Nikita Bogoslovsky
- Production company: Odessa Film Studio
- Release date: 1941
- Running time: 88 minutes
- Country: Soviet Union
- Language: Russian

Mysterious Island (Russian: «Таинственный остров», romanized: Tainstvenny ostrov, Ukrainian: «Таємничий острів», romanized: Taiemnychyi ostriv) is a 1941 Soviet film adaptation of the 1874 novel The Mysterious Island (French: L'Île mystérieuse) by Jules Verne.

== Plot summary ==
During the siege of Richmond, Virginia, in the American Civil War, five northern prisoners of war decide to escape in a rather unusual way – by hijacking a balloon.

The group eventually crash-lands on a cliff-bound, volcanic, unknown (and fictitious) island, located in the South Pacific. They name it "Lincoln Island" in honour of American President Abraham Lincoln. With the knowledge of the brilliant engineer, the five are able to sustain themselves on the island, producing fire, pottery, bricks, nitroglycerine, iron, a simple electric telegraph, and even a seaworthy ship. They also manage to find their geographical location.

The mystery of the island seems to come from periodic and inexplicable deus ex machinas: the unexplainable survival of Smith from his fall from the balloon, a box full of equipment (guns and ammunition, tools, etc.), and so on.

A crew of pirates arrives at the Lincoln Island to use it as their hideout. After some fighting with the heroes, the pirate ship is mysteriously destroyed by an explosion, and the pirates themselves are found dead, apparently in combat, but with no visible wounds.

The secret of the island is revealed when it turns out to be Captain Nemo's hideout, and home harbour of the Nautilus. Captain Nemo had been the savior of the heroes, sending a message about a fellow castaway torpedoing the pirate ship.

== Cast ==
- Andrey Andriyenko-Zemskov as Pencroft
- Yuri Grammatikati as Herbert
- Pavel Kiyansky as Gideon Spillett
- Nikolai Komissarov as Captain Nemo
- Ivan Kozlov as Tom Ayrton
- Alexei Krasnopolsky as Capt. Cyrus Harding (Smith)
- Robert Ross as Neb
- Andrei Sova as Jupe
