= Mysterious Island (2005 film) =

2005 television miniseries based on a Jules Verne novel

- DVD
- Based on: The Mysterious Island by Jules Verne
- Teleplay by: Adam Armus; Nora Kay Foster
- Directed by: Russell Mulcahy
- Starring: Kyle MacLachlan; Gabrielle Anwar; Patrick Stewart
- Theme music composer: Roger Bellon
- Composer: Roger Bellon
- Country of origin: United States
- Original language: English

Production
- Producer: Russell D. Markowitz
- Cinematography: James Chressanthis
- Editor: Colleen Halsey
- Running time: 172 minutes
- Production company: Hallmark Entertainment

Original release
- Network: Hallmark Channel
- Release: September 17, 2005

Mysterious Island (also called Jules Verne's Mysterious Island) is a 2005 television film made for Hallmark Channel that is very loosely based on Jules Verne's 1875 novel of the same name (L'Île mystérieuse). It was filmed in Thailand and directed by Russell Mulcahy.

== Plot ==
During the Civil War, six survivors escape from a prison camp in Richmond, Virginia by gas balloon and find themselves on an uncharted island in the Pacific: leading the group is Cyrus Smith. Far from any kind of known civilization, the island is inhabited by giant insects and animals, as well as the mad genius Captain Nemo. After being rescued from drowning by Nemo's crewman, Smith is separated from his group, which is reduced when one of them is eaten by a giant mantis. Later, Helen discovers a gold medallion with a map on it. Meanwhile, Smith convinces Nemo to track and rescue the other survivors, unaware that pirate Captain Bob Harvey is coming to the island, looking for a lost treasure said to be hidden there.

The survivors talk with Nemo about his role in the Indian rebellion. He reveals that his wife and daughter were killed by the British to try to find his location. That was the moment he lost faith in humanity. Nemo reveals that he plans to perfect the ultimate weapon, capable of destroying an entire city. With it, he will threaten the entire world into embracing peace. He offers Smith the chance to work with him. However, Smith rejects the offer, feeling that the weapon would be too powerful for anyone to have. This makes Nemo exile the survivors.

While wandering the island, they are attacked by giant beetles, but manage to escape by jumping into a river. Following the river to the ocean, they find an old port and boat. The boat turns out to be rotten and useless. They are subsequently attacked by a giant scorpion, but manage to kill it.

Exploring the island, the survivors witness a stranger running through a wood and find a cave on a cliff which they make their new home. While out collecting food, Helen encounters Blake - a pirate left behind during an earlier raid - and shelters from a storm with him. He declines the offer to join the group due to his past, and advises Helen to conceal her medallion. She is later captured by a giant raven, but is rescued by Blake and the stranger. Blake recognizes him as Atherton, a former member of Harvey's crew who was abandoned after a mutiny.

Harvey's ship arrives outside their cave, prompting Atherton to reveal that he was marooned rather than killed because he is Bob Harvey's brother. Helen is later captured by Harvey's men, prompting Blake to suggest a raid on the ship to rescue her. The rescue succeeds - the pirates being defeated by the element of surprise and Blake and Atherton's experience with the ship. Pencroff steals the amulet comprising the other half of the medallion's map while Blake is shot.

Having returned to shore, the crew meet Joseph, who provides them with rifles. During the subsequent fight, the survivors manage to drive off the pirates, Atherton forces Harvey into a stand-off, and Joseph is shot while departing. Staggering back to Nemo's home, Joseph pleads with Nemo to realize that he needs the survivors to remind him of what it means to be human.

Angered at the survivors' defiance of him, Harvey begins to fire the ship's cannons at the cave house. The ship is later destroyed by Nemo, and Harvey is eaten by a giant squid. As the others begin work on a new raft, Pencroff departs to try to find the treasure, needing the money to pay off his debts back in America. However, the cave where the treasure is kept is also home to gigantic spiders that end up killing him.

As they attend Pencroff's funeral, Nemo appears to them, revealing that seismic activity has been detected. That suggests that a volcano is about to erupt and destroy the island. Despite providing them with the location of a boat at his compound, he attempts to recover his equipment and plans from the Nautilus. This results in him being trapped in the Nautilus as lava fills the cavern. The remaining survivors retreat in the offered boat and hope that they will find a way home.

== Cast ==
- Kyle MacLachlan as Cyrus Smith
- Danielle Calvert as Helen
- Gabrielle Anwar as Jane
- Patrick Stewart as Captain Nemo
- Roy Marsden as Joseph
- Jason Durr as Pencroff
- Omar Gooding as Neb
- Vinnie Jones as Bob
- Tom Mison as Blake
- Chris Larkin as Atherton (as Christopher Stephens)
- Dom Hetrakul as Sun (as Dom Hatrakul)
- Geoffrey Giuliano as Li
- Nate Harrison as Lemay
- Chad Dylan Markowitz as Young Kid Soldier

== Award nomination ==
The film was nominated for the Saturn Award for Best Television Presentation in 2006.
