= Mysterious Island (serial) =

1951 film by Spencer Gordon Bennet

- Chapter 6 theatrical release poster
- Directed by: Spencer Gordon Bennet
- Written by: Screenplay: Lewis Clay; Royal K. Cole; George H. Plympton
- Based on: The Mysterious Island; 1874 novel by Jules Verne
- Produced by: Sam Katzman
- Starring: Richard Crane; Marshall Reed; Karen Randle; Ralph Hodges
- Cinematography: William Whitley
- Edited by: Earl Turner
- Color process: Black and white
- Production company: Sam Katzman Productions
- Distributed by: Columbia Pictures
- Release date: August 23, 1951
- Running time: 252 minutes (15 episodes)
- Country: United States
- Language: English

Mysterious Island is a 1951 American 15-chapter movie serial from Columbia Pictures, the studio's 46th, that stars Richard Crane, Marshall Reed, Karen Randle, and Ralph Hodges. It is an adaptation of Jules Verne's 1874 novel, The Mysterious Island (L'Île mystérieuse). As in the original story, which was Verne's follow-up to Twenty Thousand Leagues Under the Seas, this serial is set in 1865. However, Columbia's screenwriters added alien Mercurians as an additional set of villains. The serial has been labeled a space opera version of Verne's novel.

== Plot ==
During the siege of Richmond, Virginia, in the American Civil War, POW Capt. Cyrus Harding escapes from his Confederate captors in a rather unusual way – by hijacking an observation balloon. In his escape, Harding is accompanied by sailor Pencroft, his nephew Bert, writer Gideon, loyal soldier Neb, and a dog. A hurricane blows the balloon off course, and the group eventually crash-lands on a cliff-bound, volcanic, uncharted (and fictitious) island, located in the South Pacific, with very unusual inhabitants. They name it "Lincoln Island" in honour of American President Abraham Lincoln.

The castaways soon encounter a group of people that include the local natives (who worship the island's volcano), Rulu (a woman from Mercury trying to extract an unnamed superexplosive element in order to conquer the Earth), Ayrton (a wild man exiled on the island) and Captain Shard (a ruthless pirate). A mystery man, who possesses scientific powers, also makes his presence known to the group of people; he is Captain Nemo, who survived the whirlpool in 20,000 Leagues Under the Sea, and was not fatally wounded by military troops from warships. On the way, the group must battle the elements and peoples while trying to figure out a way off the island and back to civilization.

== Cast ==
- Richard Crane as Capt. Cyrus Harding
- Marshall Reed as Jack Pencroft
- Karen Randle as Rulu of Mercury
- Ralph Hodges as Herbert 'Bert' Brown
- Gene Roth as Pirate Capt. Shard
- Hugh Prosser as Gideon Spillett
- Leonard Penn as Captain Nemo
- Terry Frost as Ayrton - The Wild Man
- Rusty Wescoatt as Moley
- Bernard Hamilton as Neb (as Bernard Hamilton)
- Stanley Blystone as Confederate Officer (uncredited)
- Tom Tyler as Union Rider (uncredited)

== Chapter titles ==
1. Lost in Space
2. Sinister Savages
3. Savage Justice
4. Wild Man at Large
5. Trail of the Mystery Man
6. The Pirates Attack
7. Menace of the Mercurians
8. Between Two Fires
9. Shrine of the Silver Bird
10. Fighting Fury
11. Desperate Chances
12. Mystery of the Mine
13. Jungle Deadfall
14. Men from Tomorrow
15. The Last of the Mysterious Island

_{Source:}

== Production ==
Costumes belonging to the Western Costume Company were recycled from earlier serials for use in Mysterious Island. The Mercurian soldiers wear shirts from Universal's Flash Gordon and masks from Columbia's The Spider's Web.

== Critical reception ==
Authors Jim Harmon and Donald F. Glut were largely positive when writing about the serial: "Although fantastic beyond credibility, Mysterious Island actually contained more elements from the original source than most such adaptations of the sound era".
