= Mysterious Island (TV series) =

- Genre: Science fiction Adventure
- Based on: The Mysterious Island by Jules Verne
- Starring: Alan Scarfe; John Bach; Colette Stevenson; Stephen Lovatt; Gordon Michael Woolvett
- Music by: Varouje
- Countries of origin: Canada and New-Zealand
- No. of seasons: 1
- No. of episodes: 22

Production
- Producers: Sean Ryerson; William Fruet
- Cinematography: Alwyn Kumst
- Editors: Lisa Grootenboer; Brett Sullivan
- Running time: 45 minutes
- Production companies: Atlantis Films; Tasman Film & Television Ltd.

Original release
- Network: Family Channel
- Release: June 15 – November 9, 1995

Mysterious Island is a Canadian and New Zealand television series based on Jules Verne's 1875 novel L'Île mystérieuse. It ran for one season in 1995.

== Plot summary ==
The beginning of the series is much as in the novel. A group of refugees attempting to escape the American Civil War in a balloon wind up stranded on a remote Pacific island, where they are able to improvise a comfortable living for themselves while they wait for a passing ship. As time passes, they become suspicious that some unseen force is watching and directing their movements.

The main difference between the protagonists of the series and those of the novel is the addition of a female character, the wife of Pencroft.

The unseen watcher, Captain Nemo, is more active and less benevolent than in the novel. Able to monitor the island through steampunk-style closed-circuit television and other advanced devices, he treats the castaways as human laboratory specimens, influencing their environment to test their behaviour under stressful conditions. As the series progresses, his tests become more extreme as their continued co-operation threatens his preferred thesis that all humans are, at base, selfish and untrustworthy.

In the series finale, Nemo apparently succeeds in breaking up the group; this proves to be a ruse by the protagonists, who are now certain of Nemo's existence. After they penetrate his hideaway, Nemo admits that the 'experiment' is ruined, and offers to return the castaways to civilisation in his submarine. In a final twist, he puts out to sea without them, apparently leaving them alone on the island, without his influence for good or ill.

== Cast ==
=== Main ===
- Frank Whitten as Ayrton
- Colette Stevenson as Joanna Pencroft
- Alan Scarfe as Captain Cyrus Harding
- C. David Johnson as Jack Pencroft
- Stephen Lovatt as Gideon Spilett
- Gordon Michael Woolvett as Herbert Pencroft
- Andy Marshall as Neb Brown
- John Bach as Captain Nemo

=== Guests ===
- Jay Laga'aia as Tenape (3 episodes)

== DVD releases ==
On November 11, 2008, Echobridge Home Entertainment released the complete series on DVD in Region 1 (US only) for the very first time.

On June 14, 2011, Alliance Home Entertainment released Mysterious Island- The Complete series on DVD in Canada for the very first time.
