= Jules Verne's Mysterious Island (2012 film) =

- DVD cover
- Based on: The Mysterious Island by Jules Verne
- Written by: Cameron Larson
- Directed by: Mark Sheppard
- Starring: Gina Holden; Lochlyn Munro; Pruitt Taylor Vince; Susie Abromeit; Mark Sheppard; W. Morgan Sheppard
- Music by: Kenneth Hampton; Howard Metoyer
- Country of origin: United States
- Original language: English

Production
- Producers: Cameron Larson; Matt Keith; George M. Kotusch
- Cinematography: Dave McFarland
- Editor: Christian McIntire
- Running time: 91 minutes
- Production companies: Leverage Entertainment; Inner Media; Huze Media Group

Original release
- Network: Syfy
- Release: February 11, 2012

Jules Verne's Mysterious Island is a 2012 adventure film directed by Mark Sheppard, very loosely based on Jules Verne's 1875 novel of the same name (L'Île mystérieuse). It premiered on Syfy on February 11, 2012. The film was released on DVD on May 29, 2012.

== Plot summary ==
During the American Civil War, five northern POWs escape by hijacking a gas balloon. Drifting through the night, they awaken to find themselves marooned on a desert island, but they are not alone.

== Cast ==
- Gina Holden as Julia "Jules" Fogg
- Lochlyn Munro as Captain Cyrus Harding
- Pruitt Taylor Vince as Gideon Spillett
- Susie Abromeit as Abby Fogg
- W. Morgan Sheppard as Captain Nemo
  - Mark Sheppard as young Captain Nemo
- J. D. Evermore as Bonaventure Pencroft
- Caleb Michaelson as Hebert Brown
- Edrick Browne as Neb Nugent
- Lawrence Turner as Tom Ayrton
