= Jules Verne's Mysterious Island =

Jules Verne's Mysterious Island may refer to:

- Mysterious Island (1961 film), a 1961 science fiction adventure film
- Jules Verne's Mysterious Island (2010 film), a 2010 adventure film
