= Captain Nemo and the Underwater City =

1969 British film by James Hill

- Theatrical release poster
- Directed by: James Hill
- Written by: Pip and Jane Baker; R. Wright Campbell
- Based on: Twenty Thousand Leagues Under the Seas; 1870 novel by Jules Verne
- Produced by: Steven Pallos; Bertram Ostrer
- Starring: Robert Ryan; Chuck Connors; Nanette Newman; Bill Fraser; Kenneth Connor
- Cinematography: Alan Hume
- Edited by: Bill Lewthwaite
- Music by: Angela Morley
- Distributed by: Metro-Goldwyn-Mayer
- Release dates: 19 December 1969 (United Kingdom); 19 December 1969 (Germany); 7 October 1970 (U.S.)
- Running time: 105 minutes
- Country: United Kingdom
- Language: English

Captain Nemo and the Underwater City is a 1969 British film directed by James Hill and starring Robert Ryan, Chuck Connors and Nanette Newman. It features the character Captain Nemo and his submarine Nautilus inspired by Jules Verne's 1870 novel Twenty Thousand Leagues Under the Seas. It was written by Pip and Jane Baker.

== Plot ==
Captain Nemo's submarine Nautilus rescues drowning passengers and takes them to an underwater city, Templemer (pronounced Temple-Meer) where they are told they will remain forever. These survivors include thieving brothers Barnaby and Swallow Bath, the cowardly Lomax, Helena Beckett and her son, and Senator Robert Fraser.

Nemo takes them on a city scuba tour, but Lomax attempts to steal diving gear and escape but is caught. Fraser seems taken with a musical performance given by the city's swimming teacher Mala, this noted by Joab, Nemo's second in command.

Joab shows the Bath brothers how the city makes oxygen and fresh water and as a by-product gold, which is even thrown away. Joab advises them that no one has ever escaped Templemer. Lomax attempts to escape by using the oxygen machine to rupture the city's dome, but only manages to flood the machine's control room, killing himself in the process. While this is happening, the Bath brothers sneak into the Forbidden Area where they discover a second submarine, the Nautilus II. Seeing the second submarine as their means of escape, the brothers enlist Fraser to help them.

Fraser learns how to operate the submarine. During training they ram and kill Mobula, a vast Manta Ray-like creature accidentally created during the building of the city. Fraser tells Nemo he should leave as he is attempting to cut off the supply of weapons to the American Civil War. Nemo refuses, and offers Fraser a position at Templemer. This alienates Joab, who helps Fraser and the Baths steal Nautilus II, on condition they leave without bloodshed and allow the crew to return with the submarine intact.

They manage to take the submarine and are followed by Nemo in his submarine. Nemo explains there is fault with the Nautilus II's engines that means that it could explode. The chase is brief. Unable to match the speed of the escaping submarine, Nemo has Nautilus I sheer away, to try 'going under the reef.' Confused by their pursuers apparently giving up, Fraser asks the Nautilus II's first mate if there is 'a shorter way,' and is told 'yes, there is,' but that 'this ship is too large!'

A now desperate Fraser gives orders for 'crash speed.' As the submarine increases to flank an explosion causes the engines to fail, and out of control the ship strikes a reef before coming to a stop whilst still submerged. The crew with Fraser and the Baths put on diving gear and attempt to escape from the now flooding submarine, but Barnaby panics and drowns.

Nautilus I approaches the wreck just in time to be buffeted violently as the bigger ship explodes; Joab is electrocuted as he is thrown against a control panel. Mortally wounded he confesses to Nemo that he helped Fraser to escape. Helena Beckett admits that she knew of the attempt, and that she and her son chose to stay. Mala reads Nemo a letter that Fraser left behind, in which he thanks Nemo for offering him a place in the city's future, but that he cannot accept, as he believes in his mission, and the 'slower, more painful process' towards peace.

The film closes as Nautilus turns towards Templemer. On the surface, a small schooner is seen picking up two men in mid-ocean, far from either land or any sign of wreckage. Fraser and Swallow Bath, huddled in blankets, are taken aboard, and as the schooner prepares to set sail, Fraser finds his companion has concealed a gold ladle under his coat. The two exchange rueful smiles, and Fraser tosses it lightly into the sea.

== Cast ==
- Robert Ryan as Captain Nemo
- Chuck Connors as Senator Robert Fraser
- Nanette Newman as Helena Beckett
- Luciana Paluzzi as Mala
- John Turner as Joab
- Bill Fraser as Barnaby Bath
- Kenneth Connor as Swallow Bath
- Allan Cuthbertson as Lomax
- Christopher Hartstone as Phillip Beckett
- Ian Ramsey as Adam
- John J. Moore as Skipper (as John Moore)
- Anthony Bailey as Sailor
- Alan Barry as Sailor
- Vincent Harding as Mate Navigator

== Production ==
The film was produced on a budget of 1.5 million US dollars. It had stemmed from an idea that led to Roger Corman's failed Captain Nemo and the Floating City, itself based on a combination of two of Jules Verne's stories. Though that movie never passed the planning stage, MGM producer Steven Pallos managed to re-create the project having read a series of inspirational articles about Jacques Cousteau's experiments with deep sea habitats, and the "floating" was changed to "underwater". The film drew heavily on the imagery associated with the Victorian era, following agreement between director and scriptwriters to produce a popular escapist atmosphere, more the essence of Michael Todd's Around the World in Eighty Days than of Disney's 20,000 Leagues Under the Sea.

== See also ==
- List of underwater science fiction works
