= The Mysterious Island =

1875 novel by Jules Verne

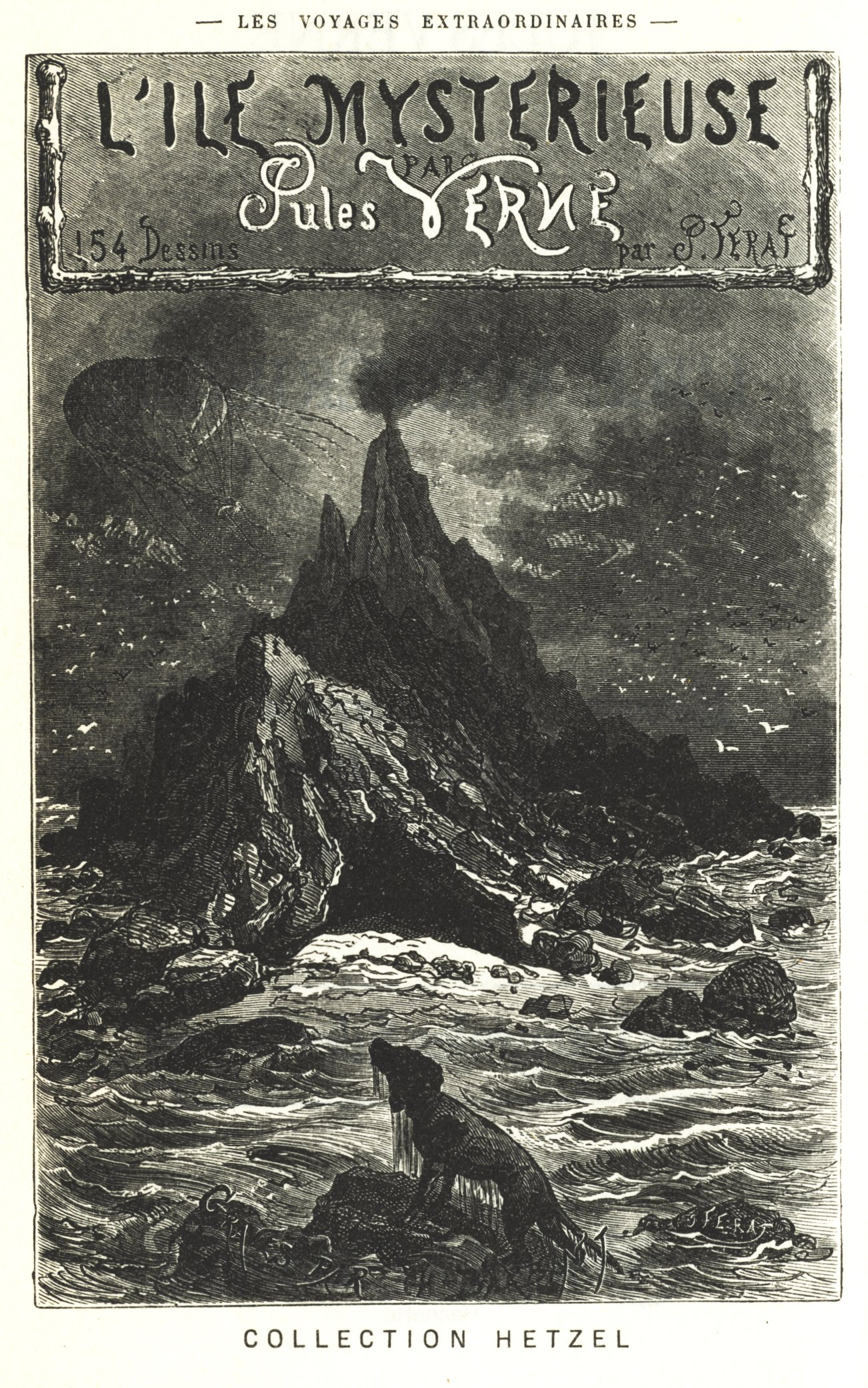
- Cover page of The Mysterious Island
- Author: Jules Verne
- Original title: L'Île mystérieuse
- Translator: Agnes Kinloch Kingston and W. H. G. Kingston (1875); Stephen W. White (1876); I. O. Evans (1959); Lowell Bair (1970); Sidney Kravitz (2001); Jordan Stump (2001)
- Illustrator: Jules Férat
- Language: French
- Series: The Extraordinary Voyages #12; Captain Nemo #2
- Genre: Adventure novel, Science fiction
- Publisher: Pierre-Jules Hetzel
- Publication date: August 1874 – September 1875 (serial); November 1875 (book)
- Publication place: France
- English publication date: 1875
- Media type: Print (Hardback)
- Preceded by: Around the World in Eighty Days
- Followed by: The Survivors of the Chancellor
- Text: The Mysterious Island at Wikisource

The Mysterious Island (French: L'Île mystérieuse) is a novel by Jules Verne, serialised from August 1874 to September 1875 and then published in book form in November 1875. The first edition, published by Hetzel, contains illustrations by Jules Férat. The novel is a crossover sequel to Verne's famous Twenty Thousand Leagues Under the Seas (1870) and In Search of the Castaways (1867–68), though its themes are vastly different from those books. An early draft of the novel, rejected by Verne's publisher and wholly reconceived before publication, was titled Shipwrecked Family: Marooned with Uncle Robinson, indicating the influence of the novels Robinson Crusoe and The Swiss Family Robinson. Verne developed a similar theme in his novel, Godfrey Morgan (French: L'École des Robinsons, 1882).

The chronology of The Mysterious Island is incompatible with that of Twenty Thousand Leagues Under the Seas, which begins in 1866, while The Mysterious Island begins during the American Civil War (1861–1865), yet is supposed to happen 16 years after Twenty Thousand Leagues.

== Synopsis ==
In 1865, during the American Civil War, five Northern prisoners of war escape during the Siege of Richmond, Virginia, by hijacking a hydrogen-filled observation balloon. The escapees are Cyrus Smith, a railroad engineer in the Union army (named Cyrus Harding in Kingston's translation); his ex-slave and loyal follower Neb (short for Nebuchadnezzar); Bonadventure Pencroff, a sailor (who is addressed only by his surname; in Kingston's version, he is named Pencroft); his protégé and adopted son Harbert Brown (called Herbert in some translations); and the journalist Gedéon Spilett (Gideon Spilett in English versions). The company is completed by Cyrus's dog, Top.^{a}

After flying in a great storm for several days, the group crash-lands on a cliff-bound, volcanic, unknown island described as being located at 34°57′S 150°30′W (Southern Pacific Ocean/Asian:Oceanian side), about 2,500 kilometres (1,600 mi) east of New Zealand and about 11,000 kilometres (6,800 mi) from Virginia. They name it "Lincoln Island" in honor of Abraham Lincoln. With the knowledge of the brilliant engineer Smith, the five are able to sustain themselves on the island, producing fire, pottery, bricks, nitroglycerin, iron, an electric telegraph, a cave home inside a stony cliff called "Granite House", and even a seaworthy ship which they name the Bonadventure. They start to think of themselves as colonists rather than castaways.

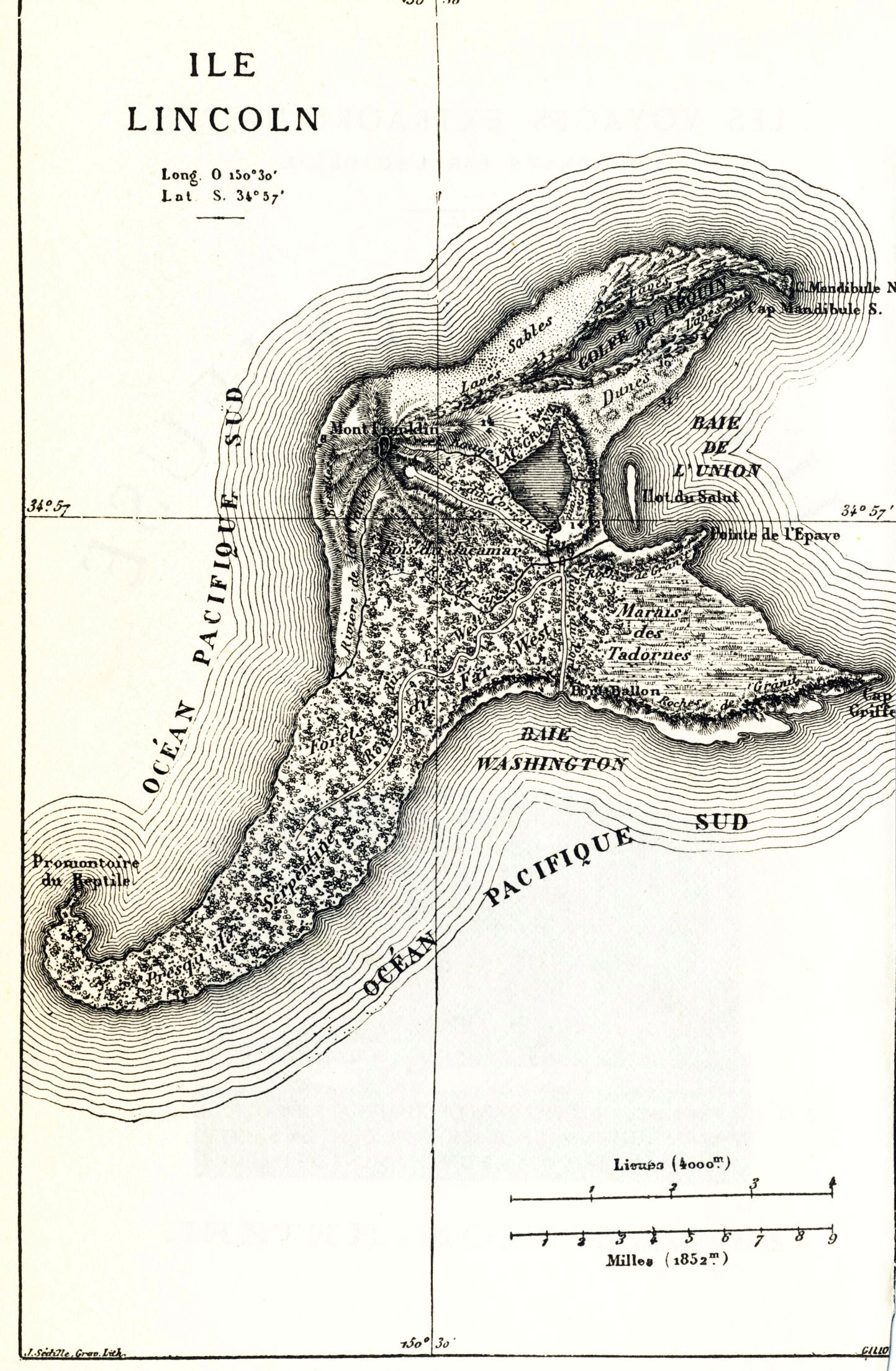
Map of Lincoln Island

During their stay on the island, the "colonists" endure bad weather and domesticate an orangutan, Jupiter, abbreviated to "Jup" (or "Joop", in Jordan Stump's translation). There is a series of mysterious events on the island, suggestive of some unseen deus ex machina, including Cyrus' survival after falling from the balloon, the mysterious rescue of Top from a dugong, the appearance of a box of equipment (guns and ammunition, tools, etc.), and other seemingly inexplicable occurrences.

The group finds a message in a bottle directing them to rescue a castaway on nearby Tabor Island, who turns out to be none other than Tom Ayrton (from In Search of the Castaways). On the return voyage to Lincoln Island, they lose their way in a tempest but are guided back to their course by a mysterious fire beacon.

Ayrton's former pirate companions arrive by chance and try to make Lincoln Island into their lair, initially being mistaken as rescuers by the colonists. After some fighting with the protagonists, the pirates' ship is mysteriously destroyed by an explosion. Six of the pirates who took small sloops to infiltrate the island survive, kidnap Ayrton, and destroy the Bonadventure. When the colonists attempt to rescue Ayrton, the pirates shoot Harbert, seriously injuring him. The colonists at first assume Ayrton has been killed, but later find evidence that he was not instantly killed, leaving his fate uncertain. When the colonists rashly attempt to return to Granite House before Harbert fully recovers, Harbert contracts malaria but is saved thanks to a box of quinine sulfate which mysteriously appears on the table in Granite House. After Harbert recovers, they again attempt to rescue Ayrton and deal with the pirates. They discover Ayrton alive at the sheepfold; the pirates, however, they find dead, without any visible wounds except a little red spot on each of them.

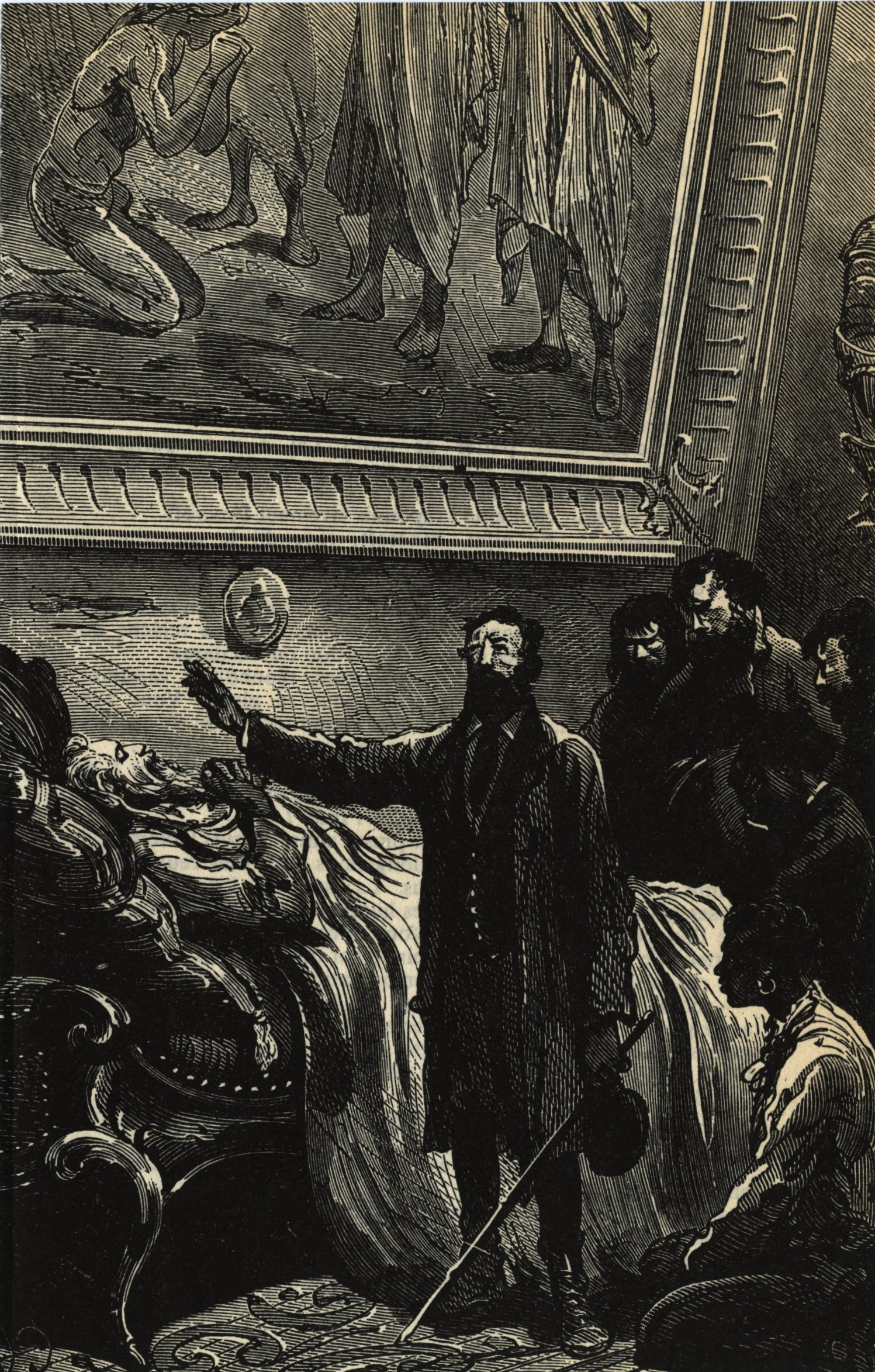
Cyrus Smith blessing Captain Nemo on his death bed in The Mysterious Island

The island is revealed to be Captain Nemo's hideout, and home port of the Nautilus. Having escaped the maelstrom at the end of Twenty Thousand Leagues Under the Seas, the Nautilus had sailed the oceans of the world until all its crew except Nemo died. Now an old man, Nemo returned the Nautilus to its secret port within Lincoln Island. Nemo had been the mysterious benefactor of the settlers, planting the torpedo that destroyed the pirate ship and killing the pirates with an "electric gun". On his death bed, Captain Nemo reveals his true identity as the lost Indian prince Dakkar, son of a raja of the then-independent territory of Bundelkund and a nephew of the Indian hero Tippu-Sahib. After taking part in the failed Indian Rebellion of 1857, Prince Dakkar escaped to a desert island with twenty of his compatriots and commenced the building of the Nautilus, adopting the name Captain Nemo. Before he dies, Nemo gives them a box of diamonds and pearls as a keepsake. Nemo's final words are "God and my country!" ("Independence!", in Verne's original manuscript). The Nautilus is scuttled and serves as Captain Nemo's tomb.^{b}

Afterward, the island's central volcano erupts, destroying the island. Jup the orangutan falls into a crack in the ground and dies. The colonists, forewarned of the eruption by Nemo, find shelter on the last remaining piece of the island above sea level. They are rescued by the ship Duncan, which had come to rescue Ayrton but was redirected by a message Nemo had left on Tabor Island. After they return to the United States, they form a new colony in Iowa, financed by Nemo's gifts, and Ayrton shows Lord Glenarvan and his son that his character has changed.

== Wrecked on a Reef influence ==
The 2003 English edition of Wrecked on a Reef (1869), a memoir by French shipwreck survivor François Édouard Raynal, has additional appendices by French scholar Christiane Mortelier who presents a case for the influence of Raynal's book on Verne's The Mysterious Island. The Grafton was wrecked near New Zealand on the Auckland Islands on 3 January 1864, where the crew of five survived for 19 months before obtaining rescue. Wrecked on a Reef, Raynal's memoir of the incident, was very popular at the time of publication, being translated into multiple languages. According to Mortelier, Verne read Raynal's account and loosely based his novel on the true life story of Grafton shipwreck, survival, privation, and ultimate rescue.

== Publication history ==
In the United States, the first English printing began in Scribner's Monthly in April, 1874, as a serial. In September, 1875, Sampson Low, Marston Low, and Searle published the first British edition of Mysterious Island in three volumes entitled Dropped from the Clouds, The Abandoned, and The Secret of the Island (195,000 words). In November, 1875, Scribner's published the American edition of these volumes from the English plates of Sampson Low. The purported translator, W. H. G. Kingston, was a famous author of boys' adventure and sailing stories who had fallen on hard times in the 1870s due to business failures, and so he hired out to Sampson Low as the translator for these volumes. However, it is now known that the translator of The Mysterious Island and his other Verne novels was actually his wife, Agnes Kinloch Kingston, who had studied on the continent in her youth. The Kingston translation changes the names of the hero from "Smith" to "Harding"; "Smith" is a very common name in the UK and would have been associated, at that time, with the lower classes. In addition many technical passages were abridged or omitted and the anti-imperialist sentiments of the dying Captain Nemo were purged so as not to offend English readers. This became the standard translation for more than a century.

In 1876, the Stephen W. White translation (175,000 words) appeared first in the columns of The Evening Telegraph of Philadelphia and subsequently as an Evening Telegraph Reprint Book. This translation is more faithful to the original story and restores the death scene of Captain Nemo, but there is still condensation and omission of some sections, such as Verne's description of how a sawmill works. In the 20th century, two more abridged translations appeared: the Fitzroy Edition (Associated Booksellers, 1959) abridged by I. O. Evans (90,000 words) and Mysterious Island (Bantam, 1970) abridged by Lowell Bair (90,000 words).

Except for the Complete and Unabridged Classics Series CL77 published in 1965 (Airmont Publishing Company, Inc), no other unabridged translations appeared until 2001, when the illustrated version of Sidney Kravitz appeared (Wesleyan University Press) almost simultaneously with the new translation of Jordan Stump published by Random House Modern Library (2001). Kravitz also translated Shipwrecked Family: Marooned With Uncle Robinson, published by the North American Jules Verne Society and BearManor Fiction in 2011.

== Translations in other languages ==
The novel has been translated into Marathi by B. R. Bhagwat titled 'निर्जन बेटावरचे धाडसी वीर', which roughly translates as "Brave Fighters on a Deserted Island", and has a cult following in Maharashtra. The novel has also been translated to Malayalam, as Nigoodadweep, translated by Kesavan Nambisan. There is more than one translation in Bengali. The translation by Kuladaranjan Roy is called “আশ্চর্য দ্বীপ” (Aschorjo Dwip) and was republished by Kalpabiswa Publications in 2023. Another translation by Shamsuddin Nawab from Sheba Prokashoni, published in 1979, is called Rahosshor Dip.

== Adaptations ==
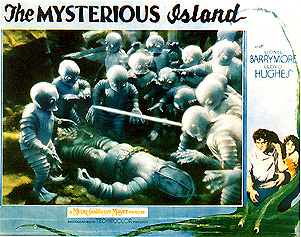
Lobby Card for the 1929 film version of The Mysterious Island, filmed in Technicolor

=== Film – English language ===
- 20,000 Leagues Under the Sea (1916 film): This classic American silent feature combines Twenty Thousand Leagues Under the Seas and The Mysterious Island into a single narrative, shifting back and forth between the Nautilus and the island.
- The Mysterious Island (1929 film): loosely based on the back-story given for Captain Nemo in the novel. It is an American part-talking feature shot largely in Technicolor, and features talking sequences, sound effects and synchronized music. Filmed as a silent but a talking sequence was added to the beginning and brief talking sequences were integrated into the film. Directed by Lucien Hubbard with Benjamin Christensen and Maurice Tourneur.
- Mysterious Island (1951 serial): a 15-chapter serial directed by Spencer Gordon Bennet.
- Mysterious Island (1961 film): directed by Cy Endfield, also known as Jules Verne's Mysterious Island, featuring special effects from Ray Harryhausen and Herbert Lom as Nemo and a score by Bernard Herrmann.
- Journey 2: The Mysterious Island: a 2012 film loosely based on the novel, directed by Brad Peyton, done as a sequel to an earlier adaptation of Verne's Journey to the Center of the Earth, with Dwayne Johnson taking over the lead role from Brendan Fraser.

=== Television – English language ===
- Mysterious Island: a Canadian television series that ran for one season in 1995.
- Mysterious Island (2005): a TV movie featuring Patrick Stewart as Captain Nemo which is only loosely based on the novel. Nominated for a Saturn Award for best TV presentation.
- Jules Verne's Mysterious Island: A 2012 cinematic adaptation, loosely based on the novel, made for the Syfy Channel.
- The 2019 Netflix television series The I-Land is inspired by Vernes' Mysterious Island, and a paperback copy of Vernes' book is featured in the first episode.

There is also some significance of an adaptation of Captain Nemo and the Mysterious Island in the first arc of the sixth season of Once Upon a Time.

=== Film and TV – foreign language ===
- Mysterious Island (1941 film): a USSR production, directed by Eduard Pentslin.
- The 1967 live-action/animated film The Stolen Airship by Czech film maker Karel Zeman is based loosely on Jules Verne's novels Two Years' Vacation and The Mysterious Island.
- La isla misteriosa y el capitán Nemo (L'Île mystérieuse) (1973): directed by Juan Antonio Bardem and Henri Colpi: a TV miniseries featuring Omar Sharif as Captain Nemo.

=== Audio and music ===
- The Mysterious Island (1977): A radio adaptation by Ian Martin broadcast on the CBS Radio Mystery Theater.
- The Mysterious Island (2018): a new radio dramatisation by Gregory Evans broadcast on BBC Radio 4 on 5 August 2018 as part of their To the Ends of the Earth drama series.
- Pulp Musicals, Episode 4: The Searcher in the Shadows (2024). The Mysterious Island served loosely as inspiration for a three-part musical by composer Matt Dahan as part of his musical radio series Pulp Musicals. The episode primarily takes places on Lincoln Island and is inspired by both The Mysterious Island and Twenty-Thousand Leagues Under the Sea.

=== Board games ===
- The boardgame Mysterious Island was published by The Game Crafter in 2019. The game is a cooperative game, based on the themes of Jules Vernes novel, where all players have to survive and escape an island.

=== Video games ===
- The computer game Myst, released 1993, and several locations featured in the game were also inspired by Jules Verne's novel. Which in turn inspired the idea of the Null Island of the digital age.
- The computer game Return to Mysterious Island (2004) is an adventure game sequel to the story. Its heroine, Mina, is shipwrecked alone on the uncharted island, and finds the body of the previous inhabitant, Captain Nemo (whom she buries). She finally escapes by locating the Nautilus and disabling the island's defenses. On November 25, 2008 Microïds (Anuman Interactive's adventure games label) announced that a sequel was being made, Return to Mysterious Island II. It had been in development by Kheops Studio since April 2008, and was released on PC and Apple iPhone on August 14, 2009.
- Zen Studios released a table based on the book for Pinball FX on June 8, 2023. Playing as Cyrus Smith, Gideon Spilett, Bonaventure Pencroft, or Harbert Brown, the objective is to survive and escape the island. The table designer was inspired from reading the book when he had a summer job.
- A popular community map designer, Papyjama, initially created a giant custom scenario centered around Lincoln Island titled The Mysterious Island for the Horn of the Abyss fan expansion of Heroes of Might and Magic III. Due to its massive popularity, the developers of Heroes of Might and Magic: Olden Era hired the creator as an official level designer. A remade version of the scenario was subsequently integrated into Olden Era

=== Literature ===
- The 2002 novel Captain Nemo: The Fantastic History of a Dark Genius has the events of this novel based on 'real' events that occurred to the real Nemo, Andre, who gave the details of his encounters to Verne.
- The 2021 novel Daughter of the Deep by Rick Riordan is inspired and a derivative work of Verne’s books 20,000 Leagues Under the Sea and The Mysterious Island.

=== Theme park ===
- Mysterious Island is also the name of a themed land at Tokyo DisneySea opened in 2001 and features two attractions based on other Jules Verne novels, Twenty Thousand Leagues Under the Seas and Journey to the Centre of the Earth.

== Notes ==
- ^a In the French original, some characters were named a little differently: Gédéon Spillet, Nabuchodonosor (Nab) and Harbert Brown. In the Kingston translation, the engineer is named Cyrus Harding, and the sailor is named Pencroft.
- ^b There are discrepancies in continuity between this novel and Twenty Thousand Leagues Under the Seas. Although this novel was written in 1874, its events take place from 1865 to 1869. The events of Twenty Thousand Leagues Under the Seas take place between 1867 and 1868. For example, the Captain Nemo appearing in this novel dies at a time when the Captain Nemo in Twenty Thousand Leagues Under the Seas was still alive. There is usually a note in most editions of the book admitting date discrepancies. There are also similar discrepancies with In Search of the Castaways, although, these are not as often pointed out. Another error is that Neb is depicted as Smith's former slave. But since Smith is identified as being from Massachusetts, where slavery was abolished in the 1780s, Neb would never have been a slave.
