= Captain Nemo =

Character created by Jules Verne

- Voyages extraordinaires character
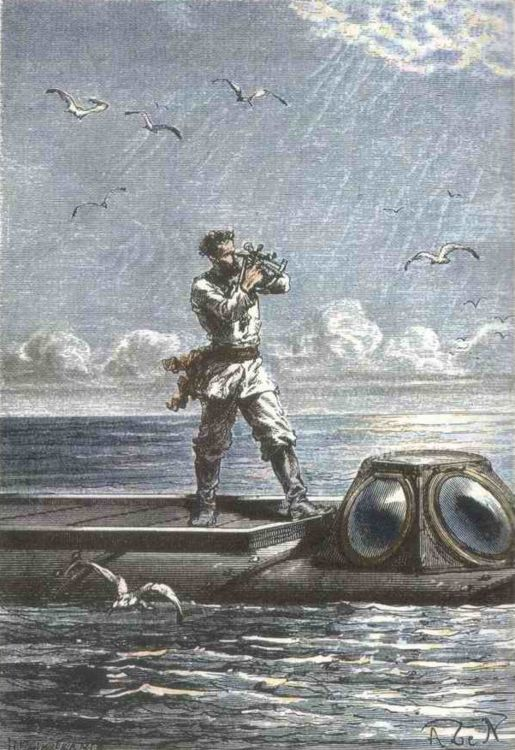
- Captain Nemo taking noon observations.
- First appearance: Twenty Thousand Leagues Under the Seas (1870)
- Last appearance: The Mysterious Island (1875)
- Created by: Jules Verne

In-universe information
- Alias: Prince Dakkar
- Gender: Male
- Title(s): Captain; Prince
- Origin: Bundelkhand, India

Captain Nemo (/ˈneɪmoʊ/ NAY-moh; also known as Prince Dakkar) is a character created by the French novelist Jules Verne (1828–1905). Nemo appears in two of Verne's science-fiction books, Twenty Thousand Leagues Under the Seas (1870) and The Mysterious Island (1875). He also makes a brief appearance in a play written by Verne with the collaboration of Adolphe d'Ennery, Journey Through the Impossible (1882).

Nemo is a mysterious figure. Though of unknown nationality in the first book, he is described as the son of an Indian raja in the second book. A scientific visionary, he roams the depths of the seas in his submarine, the Nautilus, which was assembled from parts manufactured in several different countries, then shipped to a covert address. The captain is consumed by a hunger for vengeance and hatred of imperialism; Verne included references to anti-imperialist uprisings, including the Kościuszko Uprising and Indian Rebellion of 1857, in the various backstories of Nemo.

Nemo has appeared in various film adaptations of Verne's novels, where he has been portrayed by actors such as James Mason, Herbert Lom, Patrick Stewart, Naseeruddin Shah, Ben Cross, Omar Sharif and Michael Caine. He has also been appropriated by other authors for their own novels, including Alan Moore and Kevin O'Neill's The League of Extraordinary Gentlemen, Philip José Farmer's The Other Log of Phileas Fogg, Kevin J. Anderson's Captain Nemo: The Fantastic History of a Dark Genius, Thomas F. Monteleone's The Secret Sea and Howard Rodman's The Great Eastern.

== Etymology ==
Nemo is Latin for 'no one' or 'nobody'. Nemo is itself the Latin translation of Ancient Greek Outis 'Nobody', the pseudonym adopted by the sea-faring hero Odysseus in Greek mythology to outwit the Cyclops Polyphemus. This appears to be the intended meaning, since in The Mysterious Island, when Cyrus Smith addresses him as Captain Nemo, the latter replies, "I have no name!"

== Fictional character biography ==
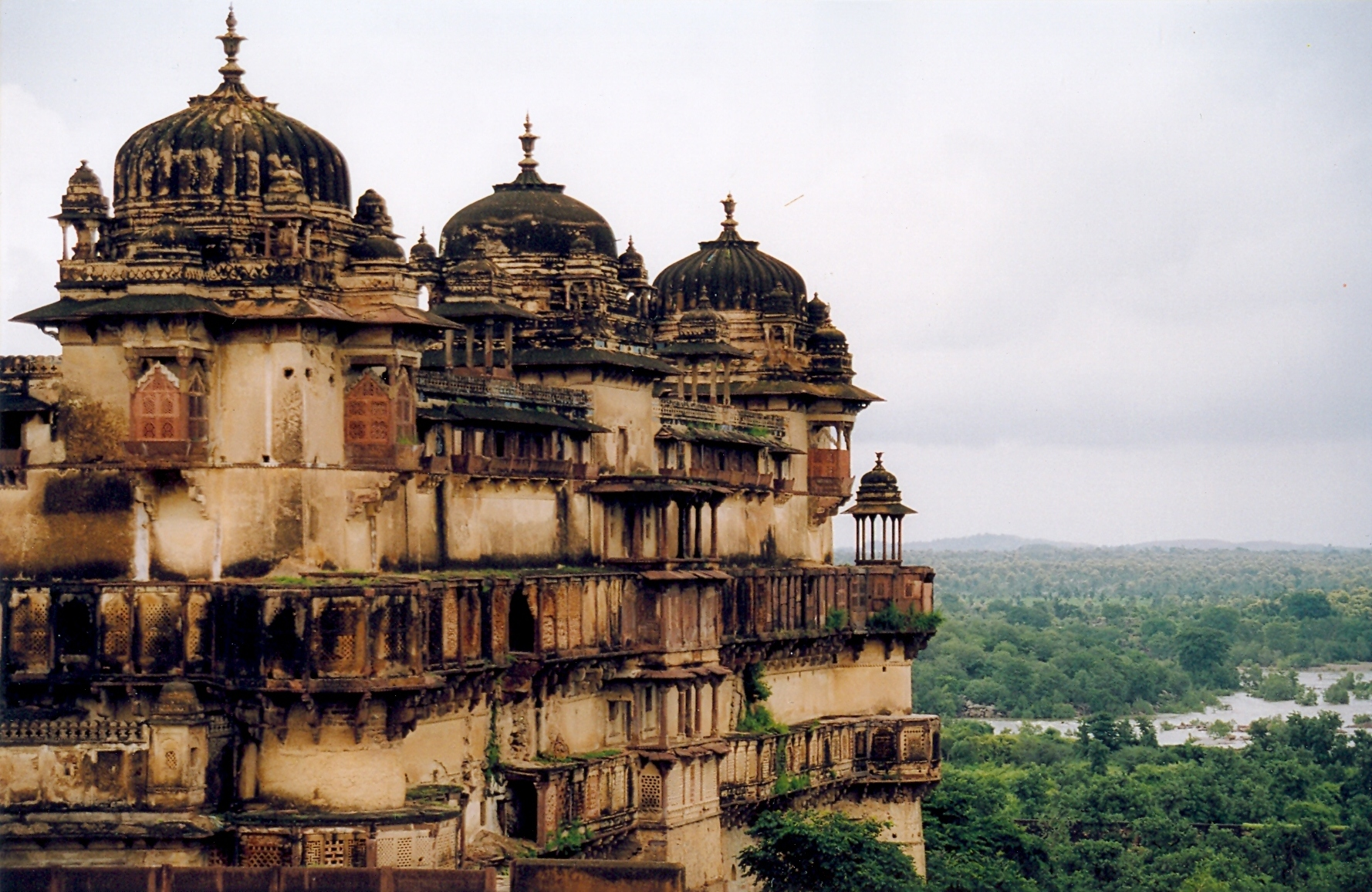
Orchha Fort complex, home to the real-life rajas of Orchha, Bundelkhand.

Chief among the few details of Nemo's history given in Twenty Thousand Leagues Under the Seas are his hatred of imperialism and his grief over the loss of his loved ones, his wife and their two young children, in years past.

In Twenty Thousand Leagues Under the Seas, Captain Nemo is not described as an Indian yet; in fact, his nationality is unknown. This was a result of an argument between the author and the publisher on this subject. Verne's original intention was to make Nemo a Pole, a participant of the January Uprising against the occupation of Poland by the Russian Empire, and it was planned that Nemo would sink Russian warships. However the publisher, Pierre-Jules Hetzel, strongly objected to this for fear of losing the lucrative Russian book market—the book would be banned by Russian censorship. In addition, Hetzel felt that the book would undermine French-Russian relations.

In The Mysterious Island, Captain Nemo identifies himself as Prince Dakkar, son of the Hindu raja of Bundelkhand, and nephew of the Muslim Sultan Fateh Ali Khan Tipu of the Kingdom of Mysore, famous for the Anglo-Mysore Wars (1767–1799) and Mysorean rocket technology. After the Indian Rebellion of 1857, in which Dakkar lost both his family and his kingdom, the prince devoted himself to scientific research, ultimately building the Nautilus and cruising the seven seas with a crew of devoted followers. They gather bullion from various shipwrecks in the ocean, most notably from the hulks of the Spanish treasure fleet sunk during the Battle of Vigo Bay.

Nemo claims to have no interest in terrestrial affairs but occasionally intervenes to aid people in distress, e.g., by giving salvaged treasure to participants in the Cretan Revolt (1866–1869) against the island's Turkish rulers; by saving (both physically and financially) a Ceylonese or Tamil pearl diver from a shark attack; by rescuing the castaways in Twenty Thousand Leagues Under the Seas; and by covertly protecting another set of castaways in The Mysterious Island.

Like many actual Indian princes of the era, Nemo received a Western education, during which, as he states, he spent his youth touring and studying throughout Europe. In his first meeting with Professor Aronnax and his companions, the three castaways speak to him in French, English, Latin, and German; Nemo later reveals that he is fluent in all of these tongues. Aronnax praises the captain's French, noting that he "expressed himself with perfect ease and without any accent." Relying on his intuition and knowledge of ethnology, the professor concludes that "there's southern blood" in him but can't determine the captain's exact origin. The Nautilus's library, lounge, and art collections reveal that Nemo is intimately acquainted with European culture, and that he is an accomplished performer on the organ.

Nemo dies of unspecified natural causes on board the Nautilus, docked permanently inside Dakkar Grotto on Lincoln Island in the South Pacific. Cyrus Harding, leader of the castaways whom Nemo protected, performs the last rites, then submerges the Nautilus in the grotto's waters. Shortly after, the volcanic island is destroyed when magma reaches the seawater in the grotto, creating a massive steam explosion which blows the island and the Nautilus to pieces.

== Character ==
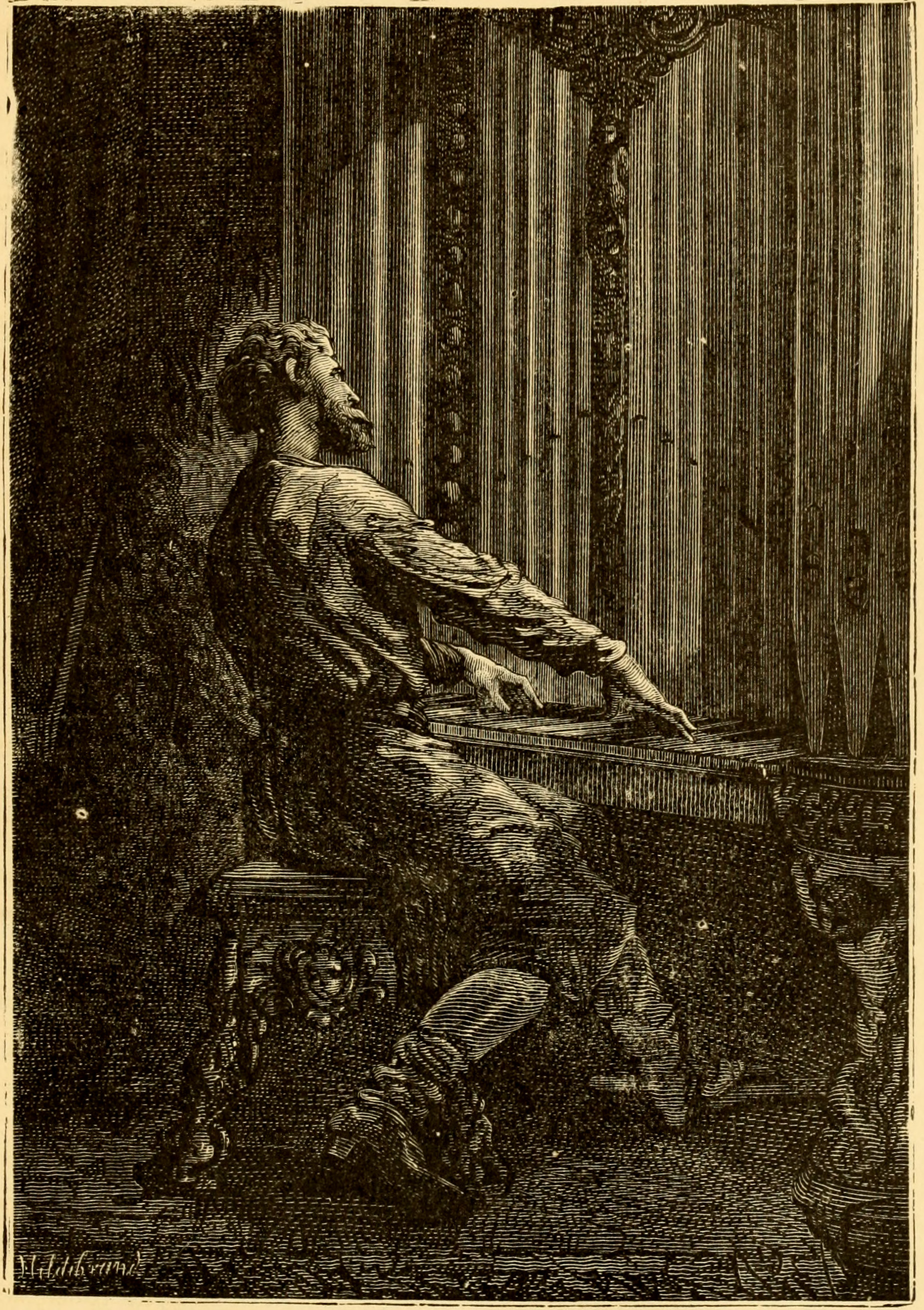
Captain Nemo is an accomplished performer on the organ.

Nemo's characteristics are largely presented through the observations of Professor Pierre Aronnax, narrator of Twenty Thousand Leagues Under the Seas. At their first meeting, the professor remarks: "Whether this individual was thirty-five or fifty years of age, I couldn't tell." He goes on to describe Nemo as a tall, self-contained man with a straight nose, broad brow, and wide-set eyes—"certainly the most wonderful physical specimen I'd ever met up with." In The Mysterious Island, the captain is in his late sixties and sports a long white beard.

He avoids dry land, except for desert islands and uninhabited regions such as Antarctica. In keeping with his contempt for surface civilization, he uses few commodities that aren't marine in origin, be they food, clothing, or even tobacco. As for his political views, he reveals an intense hatred of oppression, which he associates with the world's imperialistic nations. He therefore identifies himself with the Earth's oppressed, whether Ceylonese pearl divers, Cretans rising against the Turks, or even right whales attacked by sperm whales. When Professor Aronnax suggests that Nemo violates maritime and international law by sinking warships, Nemo responds that he does so in self-defense when attacked. He insists that terrestrial laws no longer apply to him, exclaiming in one scene:

The sea doesn't belong to tyrants. On its surface they can still stake their evil claims, battle each other, devour each other, haul every earthly horror. But thirty feet below sea level, their power ceases, their influence fades, their domination vanishes! Ah, sir, live! Live in the heart of the seas! Here alone do I find independence! Here I recognize no superiors! Here I'm free!

Nemo is devoted to his crew and grieves deeply when members are killed after a mysterious collision with a surface vessel or during a giant squid attack in the Caribbean Sea. He is equally compassionate in his treatment of the castaways in The Mysterious Island, also retaining a deep attachment to his deceased wife and children. Despite these tragic losses, he rarely expresses his anger. Moreover, he is a man of immense courage, taking the lead in every emergency, from fighting sharks and squids to releasing the Nautilus from Antarctic ice—an ordeal that entailed reduced oxygen stores and consecutive eight-hour shifts. Aronnax also credits him with discovering Atlantis.

An innovative engineer, Nemo both designed and manufactured the Nautilus, including her electric propulsion units and navigational systems. Utilizing them with extraordinary skill, he navigated some of the ocean's most difficult underwater passages, such as those beneath the Antarctic ice barrier, as well as a fictitious tunnel under the Isthmus of Suez.

He has an exhaustive knowledge of marine biology, and it is his respect for Professor Aronnax's preeminence in the field that led to his befriending the professor once the latter was cast aboard the Nautilus. Further, Nemo is a polyglot, able to read all the books in the Nautilus's vast library, regardless of their language. He demonstrates his linguistic ability in Twenty Thousand Leagues Under the Sea, when Arronax and two other character speak to him in French, English, German, and Latin and he understands all four languages. Other than this he also knows Indian languages Hindi, Kannada, Tamil, Telugu, and Malayalam, furthermore Greek among others. Nemo also invents a new language that he and his crew use to communicate with each other.

The captain has a different taste in the fine arts, possessing many masterpieces of both painting and sculpture, from old masters to moderns. They are housed in the main lounge of the Nautilus along with Nemo's collection of pearls, corals, seashells, and other marine items, all gathered with his own hands. "No museum in Europe," Aronnax tells the captain, "has such a collection of exhibits." Yet, despite the opulence visible throughout the Nautilus, Nemo's stateroom was furnished with little more than a bed, a worktable, and the navigational instruments essential to the Nautilus. Even so, Captain Nemo claims to be extremely wealthy, boasting that "without the slightest trouble I could pay off the two-billion-dollar French national debt!"

Nemo later tells Aronnax that he will enclose his scientific findings and autobiography in a small unsinkable container: "The last one of us left on the Nautilus will throw that container into the sea, and it will drift wherever the waves take it."

Subsequently, a rather different container does wash ashore in The Mysterious Island, bearing tools, firearms, navigational instruments, an atlas, books, blank paper, and even clothing. They are found in a crate lashed to empty barrels, its contents sealed in a waterproof zinc envelope and showing careful preparation, and packing. Throughout the same book, Nemo repeatedly acts in this providential way, as when the sailor Pencroff pines for tobacco, then the young naturalist Harbert identifies some of the island's plant life.

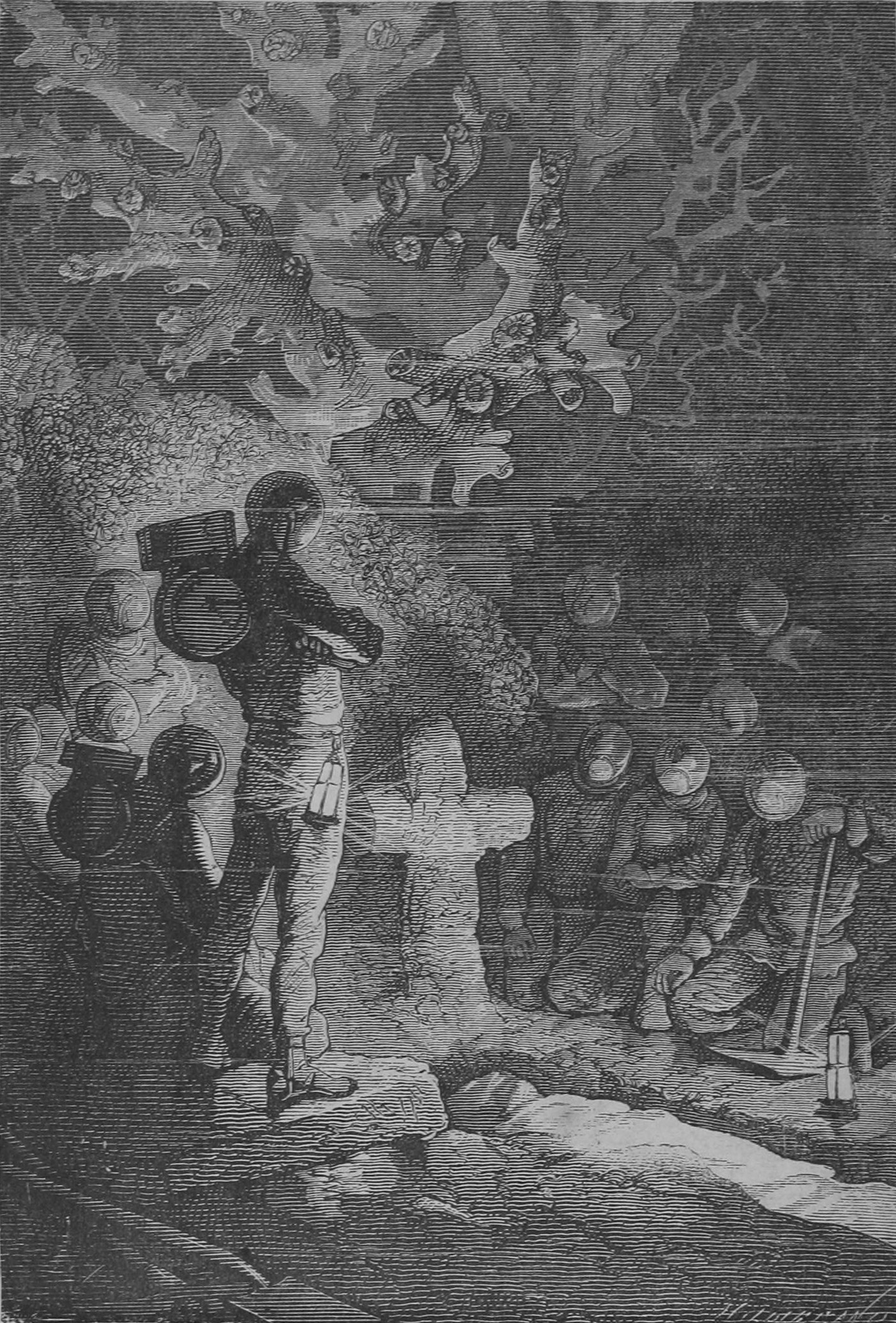
Captain Nemo and the crew of the Nautilus conduct an underwater funeral.

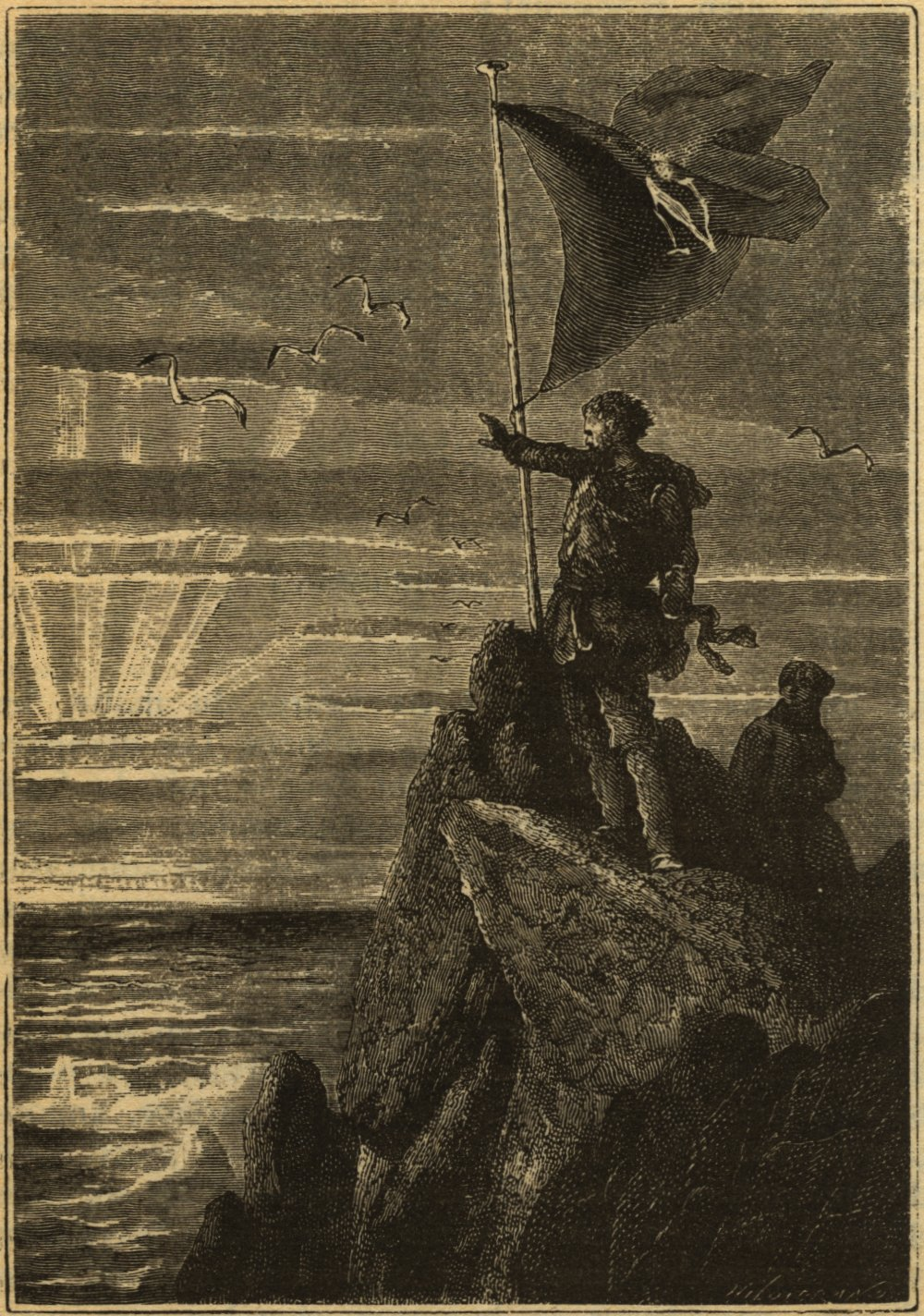
Captain Nemo raising his flag on the South Pole

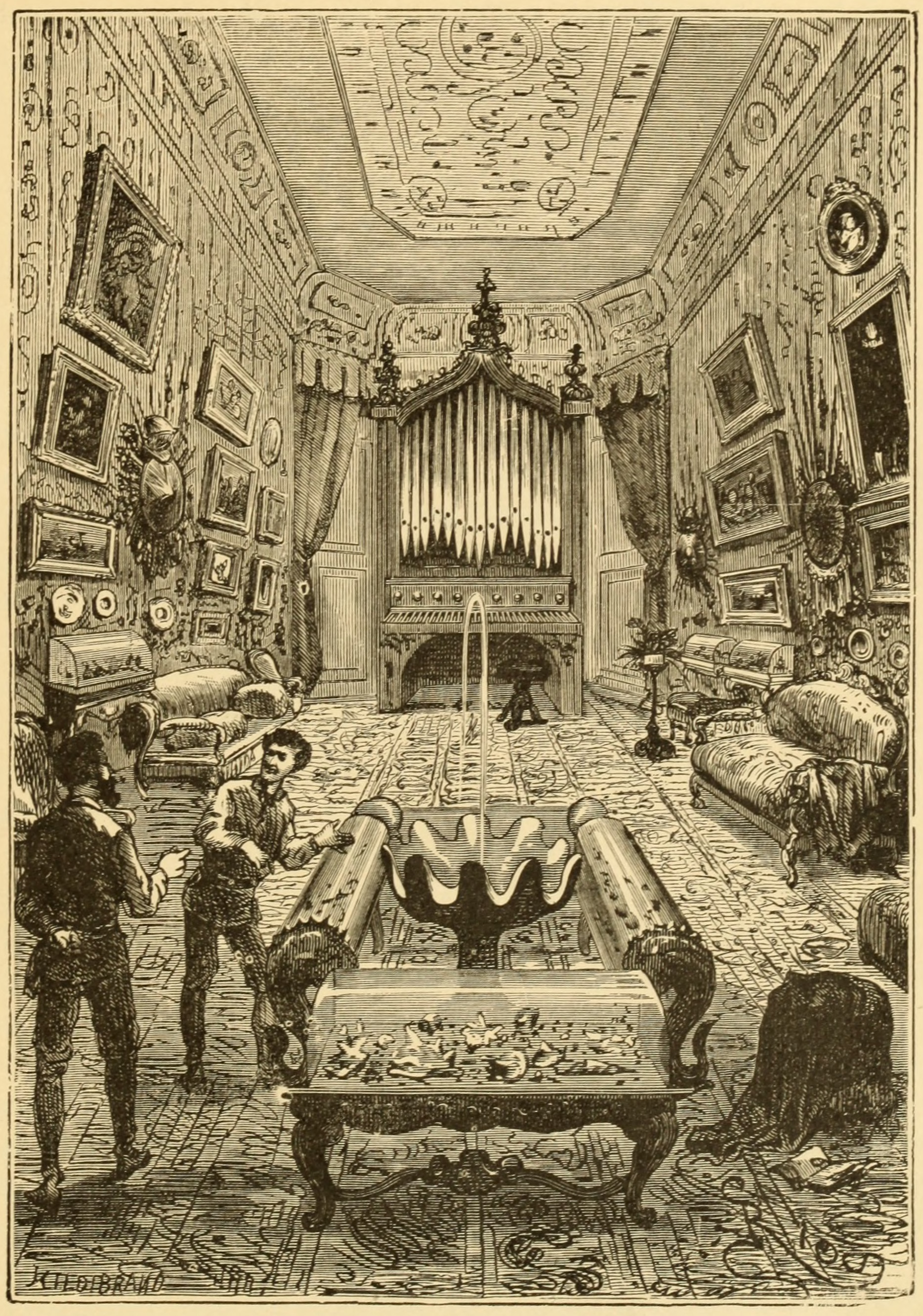
The main lounge of the Nautilus

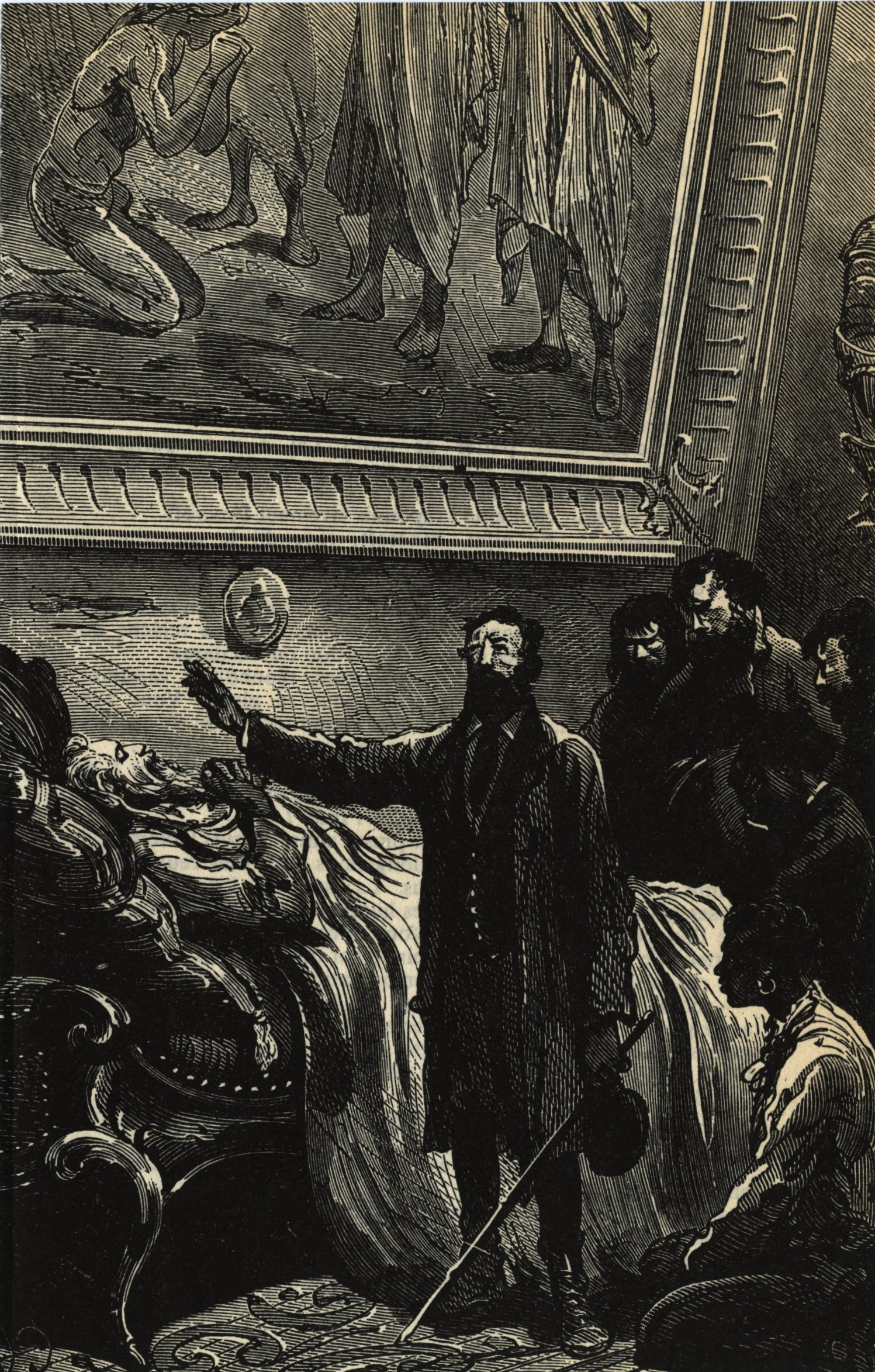
Captain Nemo's death in The Mysterious Island

== Origin ==
In early drafts of Twenty Thousand Leagues Under the Seas, Nemo appears as a Polish noble, a member of the szlachta bent on avenging the murder of his family during Russia's violent suppression of the January Uprising. Verne's editor Pierre-Jules Hetzel feared that the book would offend the Russian Empire, a major French ally, and cause the book to be banned from that country's bookstores. Accordingly, Hetzel insisted that Verne revise the novel to conceal Nemo's background and political motivations.

== Portrayals ==
In most subsequent media adaptations of 20,000 Leagues and Mysterious Island, Captain Nemo is depicted as a European, in accordance with the earlier of the two novels. Actors who have played him include:

- Allen Holubar in 20,000 Leagues Under the Sea (1916)
- Lionel Barrymore (as Count Andre Dakkar) in The Mysterious Island (1929)
- Leonard Penn in the Columbia film serial Mysterious Island (1951)
- Thomas Mitchell in the TV series Tales of Tomorrow (1952)
- James Mason in the Walt Disney film 20,000 Leagues Under the Sea (1954)
- Herbert Lom in Mysterious Island (1961)
- Julian Somers in the 8-part BBC Radio serial 20,000 Leagues Under The Sea (1961)
- Robert Ryan in Captain Nemo and the Underwater City (1969)
- Omar Sharif in La isla misteriosa y el capitán Nemo (1973)
- Len Carlson in the animated series The Undersea Adventures of Captain Nemo (1975)
- Vladislav Dvorzhetsky in the Soviet television miniseries Captain Nemo (1975)
- José Ferrer in the TV movie and short-lived TV series The Return of Captain Nemo (1978)
- Akio Otsuka in the anime series Nadia: The Secret of Blue Water (1990–1991)
- John Bach in the TV series Mysterious Island (1995)
- Michael Caine in the ABC-TV miniseries 20,000 Leagues Under the Sea (1997)
- Ben Cross in the NBC TV movie 20,000 Leagues Under the Sea (1997)
- Naseeruddin Shah in the film The League of Extraordinary Gentlemen (2003)
- Patrick Stewart in the TV movie Mysterious Island (2005)
- Sean Lawlor in the film 30,000 Leagues Under the Sea (2007)
- W. Morgan Sheppard and Mark Sheppard in the film Mysterious Island (2012)
- Faran Tahir in the TV series Once Upon a Time (2016–2017)
- Sagar Arya in the BBC Radio adaptations of 20,000 Leagues Under The Sea and The Mysterious Island (2018)
- Shazad Latif in the TV series Nautilus (2024)
- Jesse Bhamrah in the radio-musical series Pulp Musicals (2021-Present).
- Vernon Wells in the Mindstream Players Radio Reborn Podcast adaptation of 20,000 Leagues Under the Sea (2025)

== Historical connection ==
Writing in the April 2025 edition of Foundation – The International Review of Science Fiction, John Lamb stated there were many links between the fictional Captain Nemo and the Nautilus and Raphael Semmes the captain of the Confederate commerce raider CSS Alabama in the American Civil War. Lamb wrote:

Both the Alabama and the Nautilus were mainly built in Birkenhead. Both Semmes and Nemo were gifted natural historians. Nemo’s motto was ‘'Mobilis in Mobile'’ while Semmes was from Mobile, Alabama. Semmes was branded a pirate by Abraham Lincoln, who put a bounty on Semmes’s head, and Semmes was chased around the seas by Admiral Farragut of the U.S. Navy. Nemo, conversely, was branded a pirate by Captain Farragut of the U.S. Navy, who put a bounty on Nemo’s head, and Nemo was chased around the seas by the ship Abraham Lincoln. Both Semmes and Nemo encounter an imaginary island, sail through a patch of white water, encounter fake Havana cigars, mention coral mausoleums, shelter in an extinct volcanic island, and have their final battle off Cherbourg. Semmes had a portrait of the Confederate president, Jefferson Davis, in his cabin while Nemo had a portrait of the Union president, Abraham Lincoln, in his. The Alabama was bankrolled from the Confederate headquarters at Nautilus House, Liverpool.

== In popular culture ==
In the League of Extraordinary Gentlemen comic series by Alan Moore and Kevin O'Neill, Captain Nemo's Indian ancestry as Prince Dakkar is emphasized, yet his religious identity is left ambiguous between Hinduism and Sikhism. Journalist Shreya Ila Anasuya writes that Moore's Nemo is "nebulously portrayed as a Kali-worshipping man in a turban, never self-consciously Sikh." The title of "Nemo" is later inherited by Prince Dakkar's daughter, Janni Dakkar, in League of Extraordinary Gentlemen: Nemo Trilogy, and by Janni's grandson Jack Dakkar, in League of Extraordinary Gentlemen, Volume IV: The Tempest.

Nemo is the official file manager for the Cinnamon desktop environment; the name plays off of the Nautilus file manager from which it was forked.

The Michael Schenker Group instrumental song "Captain Nemo" was released on their 1983 album Built To Destroy.

A Polish singer – Bogdan Gajkowski – popular especially during the 1980s, started recording under the stage name "Kapitan Nemo".

In 1990, the group Dive released their debut single "Captain Nemo", based on Verne's character. This song was covered by Sarah Brightman on her 1993 album Dive.

In 1998, Swedish group, Ace of Base released their 3rd album, Flowers, with a song named Captain Nemo. The song refers to captain Nemo as one who prefers to avoid human contact, and watch the world from the bottom of the sea.

The Japanese otome visual novel Code: Realize- Guardian of Rebirth features a scientist named Nemo. Nemo creates an airship named the Nautilus within the game. He considers the engineer Impey Barbicane, a reference to another Jules Verne novel, his ultimate scientific rival.

The Japanese mobile game Fate/Grand Order features a rider class servant named Captain Nemo. Nemo commands a magical submarine Nautilus through the Void Space.

Kevin J. Anderson wrote Captain Nemo: The Fantastic History of a Dark Genius (2002), a fictional life of Captain Nemo.

In the 2006 graphic novel Captain Nemo by Jason DeAngelis (Seven Seas, ISBN 978-1933164083), set in an alternate timeline where Napoleon was never defeated at Waterloo but went on to found a dynasty whose descendants have conquered most of the world, Captain Nemo was, according to the French authorities, "slain and his accursed Nautilus sunk" in 1873, and twenty years later his son (who bears the same name as his father) leads his crew aboard the Nautilus II against the forces of Napoleon IV using the same tactics as his father, who is buried in a coral tomb, along with members of his crew, on the sunken island of Lemuria.

In 2009 Chris Taylor designed a solitaire board game named Nemo’s War. The 2nd edition released in 2017. Taylor released his latest edition, the ultimate edition, in 2022. On the board game geek website it has garnered high marks and considered by many their most favorite board game.

Daughter of the Deep, a 2021 novel by Rick Riordan, features two descendants of Captain Nemo as the protagonist and antagonist.

The animated series Space Strikers (known in French as 20,000 Lieues dans l'espace; translation: "20,000 Leagues in Space") stars a descendant of the original Captain Nemo, leading the crew of the spaceship Nautilus in a crusade to liberate Earth and other planets from the evil forces of Master Phantom.

In the novel ... no one of Alberto Cavanna (original title ... nessuno, Mursia, Italy, 2020), Nemo is John Digby, an admiral of the Royal Navy, appointed captain of the Nautilus by the dying builder.

Captain Nemo appears as the protagonist of the story Invitación al viaje (2023) by Óscar Esquivias.

Captain Nemo appears in two gamebooks, Nemo's Fury, and Nemo's 2: Octo War, by Chris Hunneysett.

The 2024 ten-part adventure drama television series Nautilus focuses on Nemo and the backstory of the eponymous submarine. A reimagining of the original Verne novel, the series presents an origin for Nemo as a prince-turned-crusading scientist.

The winner of the Eurovision Song Contest 2024, Nemo Mettler, is named after Captain Nemo.

== Gallery ==
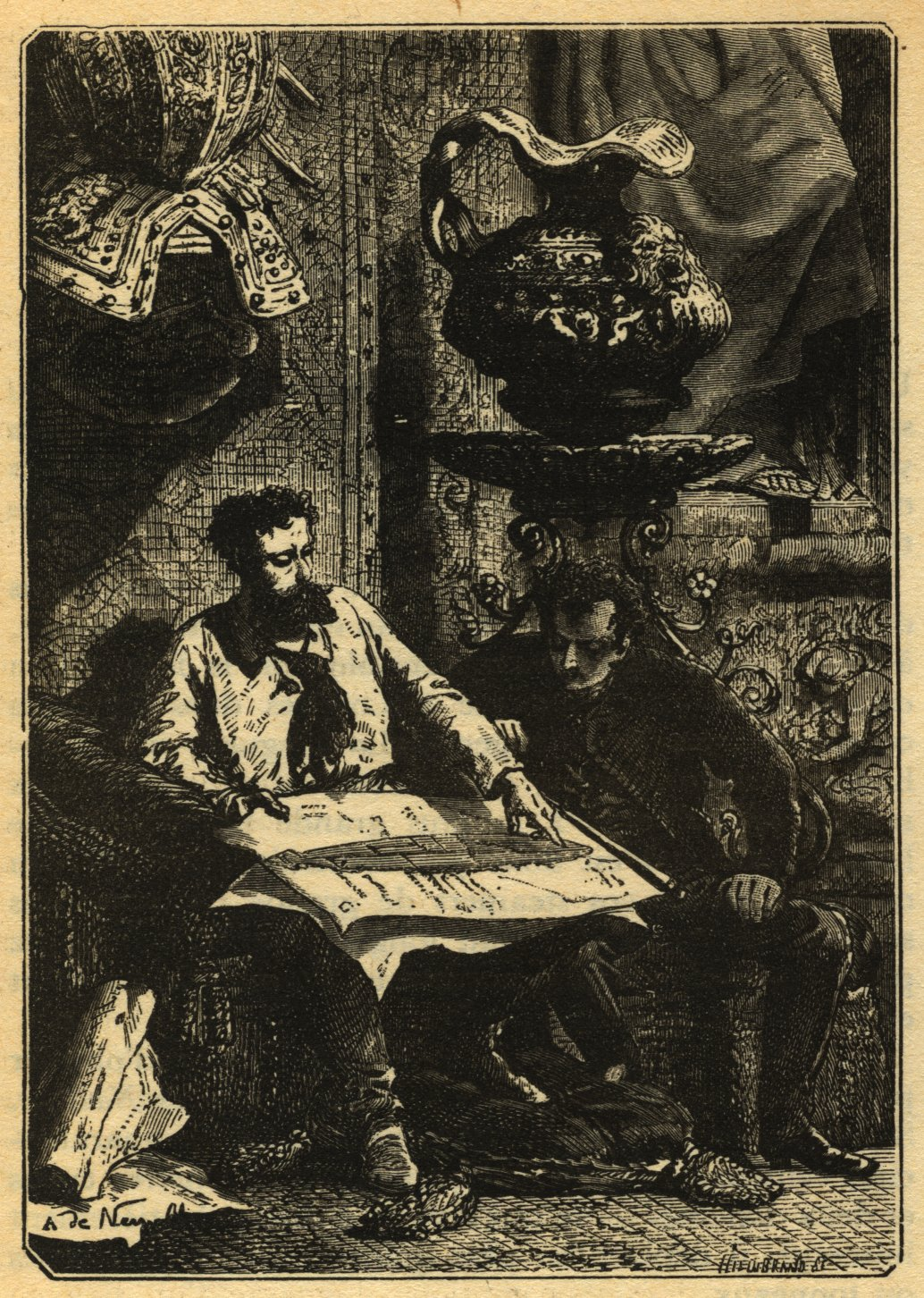
A working drawing of the Nautilus.

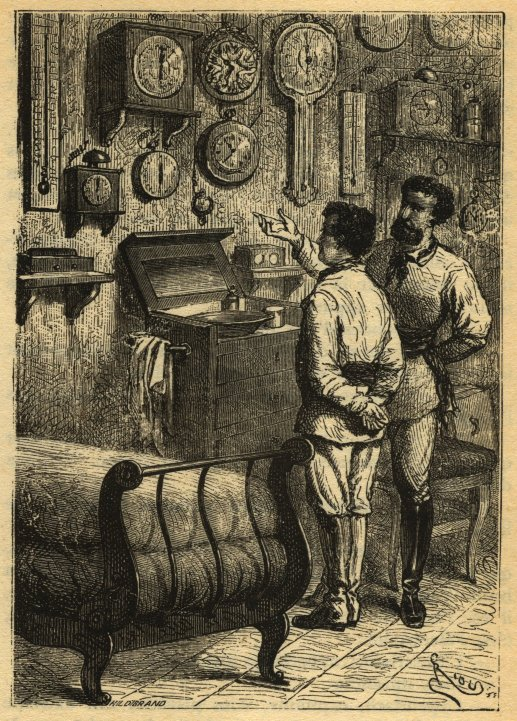
Captain Nemo's stateroom.

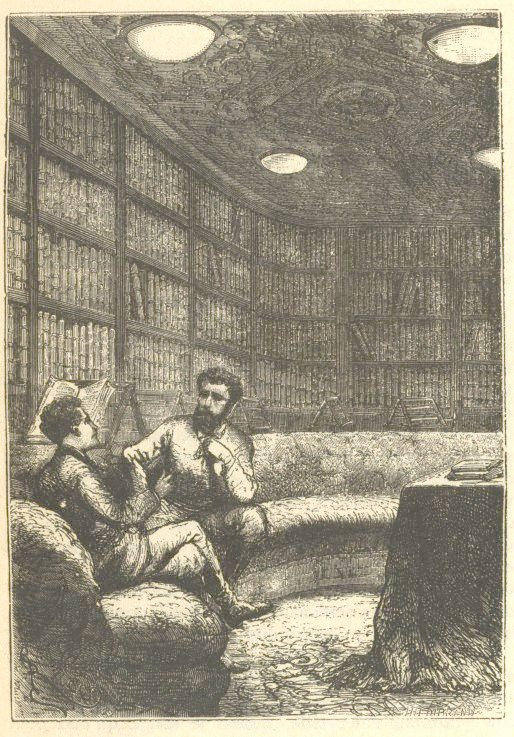
The Nautilus's library.

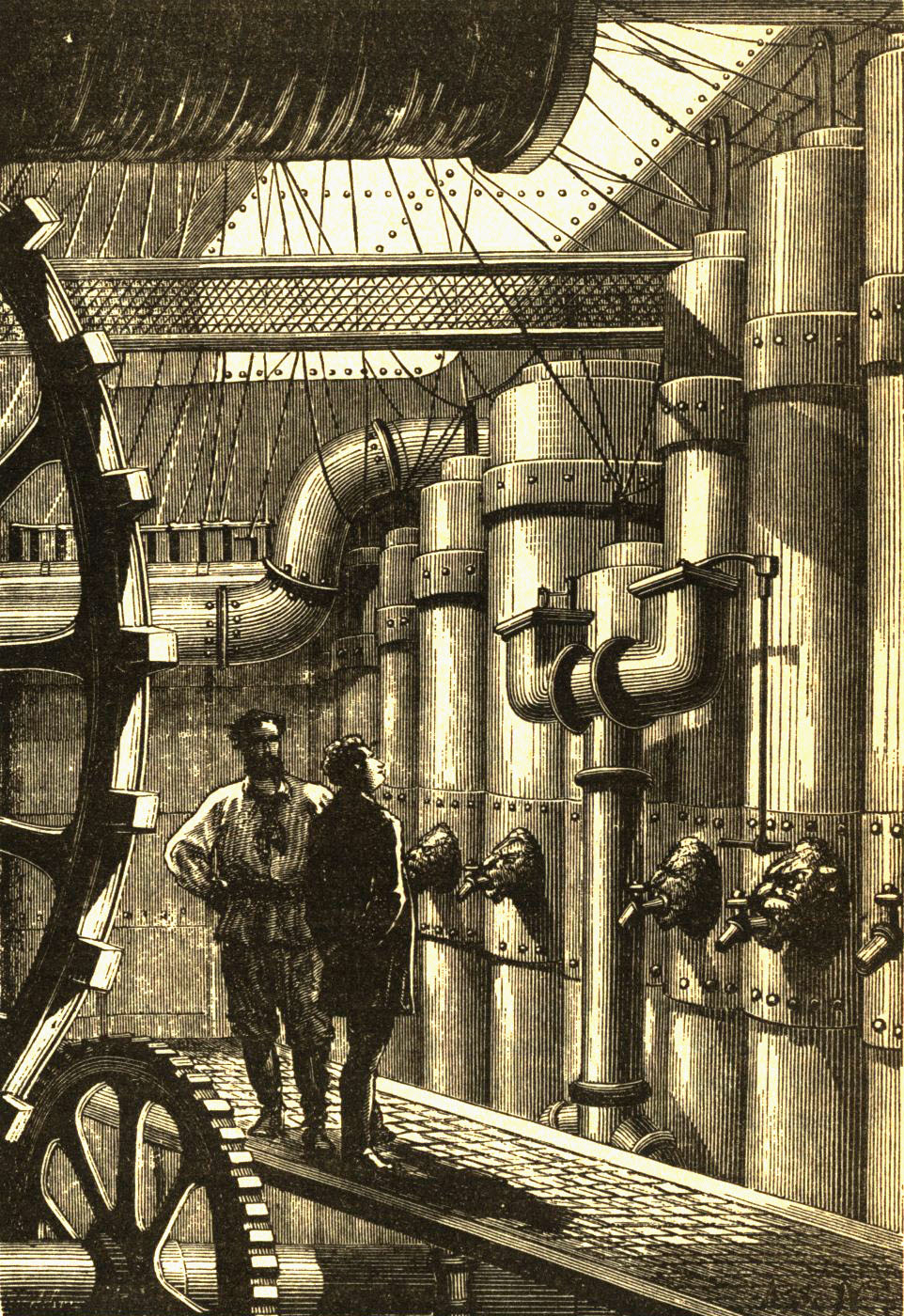
The Nautilus's engine room.

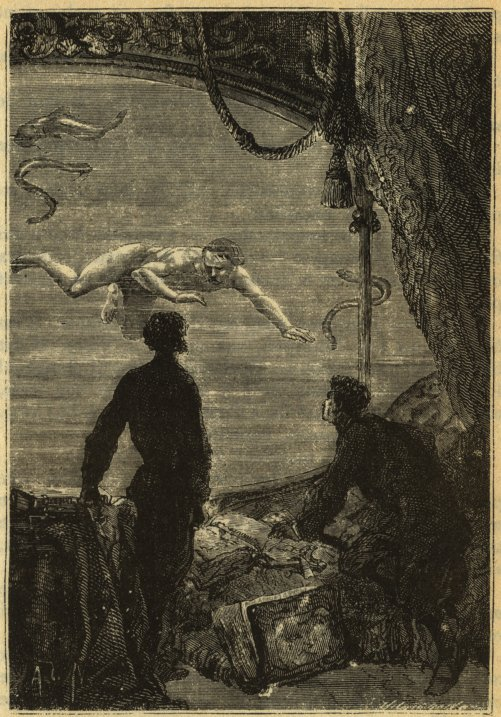
Diver appearing off Crete.

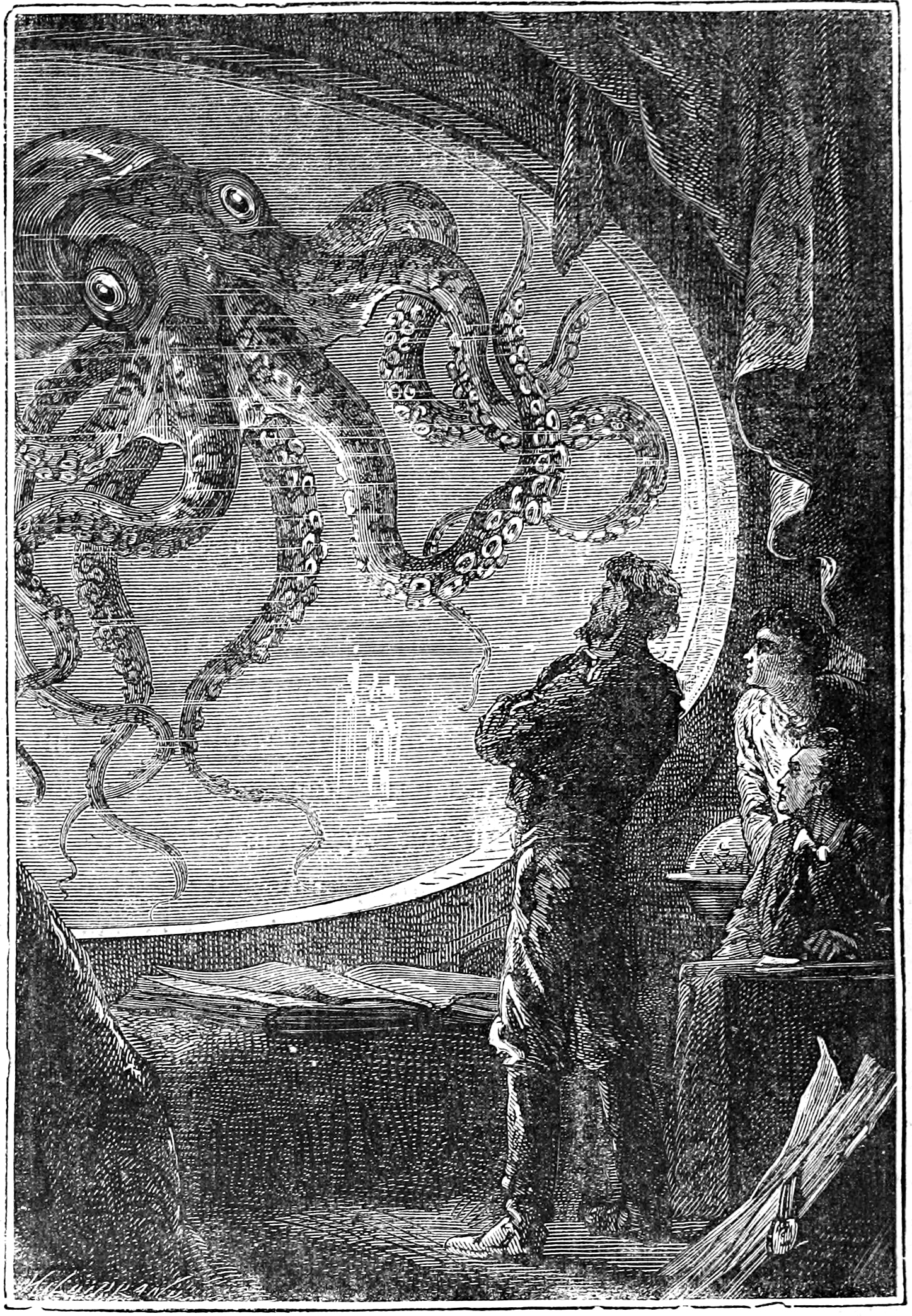
Menaced by a giant squid in the Bahamas.

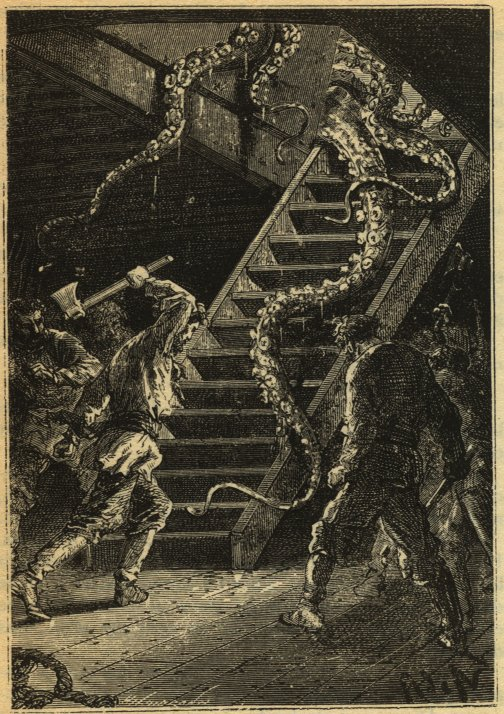
Fending off a squid attack.

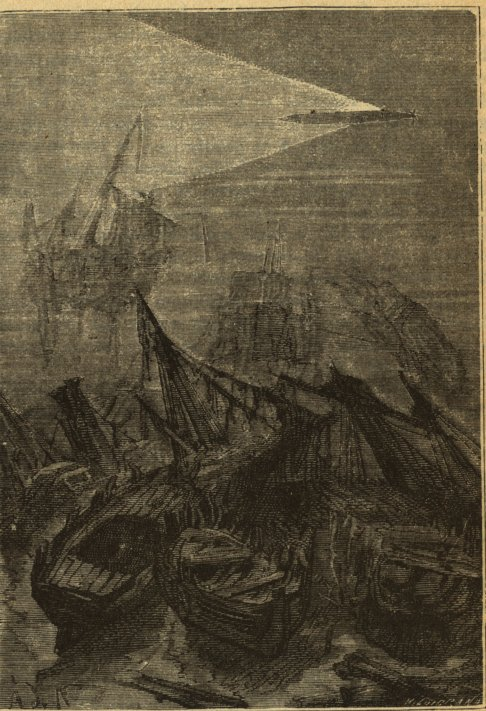
Underwater wreckage in the Mediterranean.

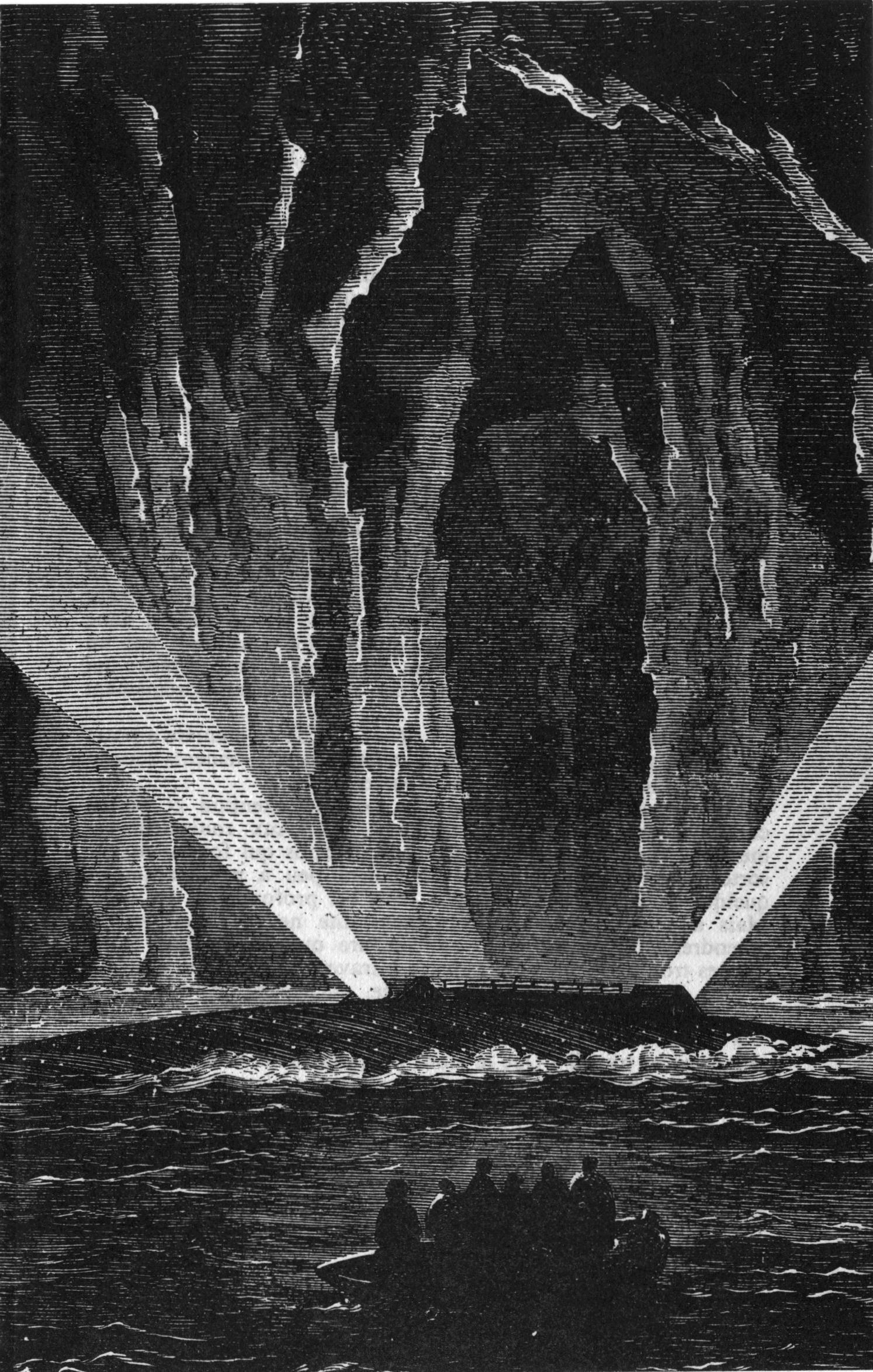
The Nautilus in Dakkar Grotto, as described in The Mysterious Island

== See also ==
- List of underwater science fiction works
