= Tom Ayrton =

Fictional character created by Jules Verne

- Voyages Extraordinaires character
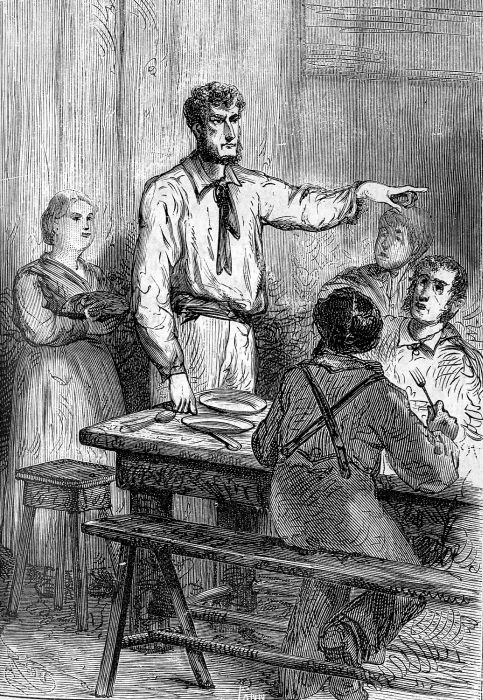
- Ayrton in Les Enfants du capitaine Grant
- First appearance: Les Enfants du capitaine Grant (1868)
- Last appearance: L'Île mystérieuse (1874)
- Created by: Jules Verne

In-universe information
- Gender: Male
- Occupation: Quartermaster
- Nationality: Scottish

Tom Ayrton is a fictional character who appears in two novels by French author Jules Verne. He is introduced as a major character in the novel In Search of the Castaways (1867–1868). He then reappears in a later novel, The Mysterious Island (1875), in which his fate, left unknown at the ending of the previous novel, is resolved, and during the course of which his character undergoes change and achieves a redemption.

== Biography ==
=== In Search of the Castaways ===
A Scottish able seaman, Ayrton served as quartermaster on board the three-mast ship Britannia, under the command of Captain Harry Grant. Differing opinions and extreme disputes with Grant led Ayrton to attempt leading a mutiny, the failure of which ended in his being expelled from the ship. Left behind alone on Australian shores, Ayrton learned nothing of the calamity that soon befell Grant's ship and crew.

Teaming up with a band of escaped convicts, Ayrton began a life of crime around Australia, becoming a cunning highwayman and eventually a notorious gang leader under the name of Ben Joyce. Wishing to commandeer a swift ship in order to become a pirate leader as well, he took advantage of an opportunity supplied by the arrival of Lord Glenarvan's Scottish expedition searching for the castaways of the Britannia. Learning for the first time of the Britannia's foundering, Ayrton tricked the searchers into a fraudulent wild goose chase for the alleged location of the shipwreck, while at the same time conspiring with his gangmates to ambush and delay the expedition while he made a grab for their own powerful ship, the Duncan. However, a prodigious set of circumstances resulted in his treacherous scheme backfiring, and in his falling into the hands of the searchers and facing harsh justice for his crimes.

Being in the position to bargain for his fate, Ayrton arrived at a deal with Glenarvan, saying that in return for truthful information about the castaways he will not be delivered into the hands of English justice, but rather be marooned as a castaway on the desolate Tabor Island. While his information proved of no value to the searchers, the missing castaways were miraculously discovered on Tabor upon arrival there, and as the deal had to be respected, Ayrton took their place and was left there for an indefinite period so as to expiate for his crimes.

=== The Mysterious Island ===
Ayrton reappears in The Mysterious Island, after castaways living on Lincoln Island learn of an abandoned man's presence on the neighboring Tabor and set out to rescue him. Finding him, they discover that, having suffered solitude and remorse for long years, he has eventually lost his reason and has become brutish. Taken to Lincoln Island, his mental health is finally restored thanks to the colonists' care and friendship. He reluctantly joins their group, suffering great remorse and feeling he is unworthy of living among honest men. However, he proves his worth and redeems himself by working for the common good of the group, and finally by remaining steadfast and loyal to his new friends when facing the temptations of his past lifestyle, during a pirate attack on the island. Thus reformed, he later returns to society with his friends.

== In other media ==
- Ayrton (here going by the forename "Thomas") is mentioned in the 1961 film Mysterious Island. Marooned by a group of pirates and his tongue cut out, he eked out a meager existence living in a cave on the island until he could no longer bear his desolation and hanged himself. His remains and the diary describing his story are found by the film's protagonists inside the cave three years later, in the year 1865, and his fate in the original novel (his degeneration "into animal savagery") is alluded to by war correspondent Spillit as he concocts a sensationalist article about Ayrton's fate on the fly.
- In the Gainax anime Nadia: The Secret of Blue Water, which borrows many elements of Jules Verne's stories (most notably, Captain Nemo and the Nautilus), Nadia and Jean encounter a man named Ayrton who is initially serving aboard the steam frigate USS Abraham Lincoln. It's not clear in what context Ayrton is serving but he claimed that he was investigating the alleged "sea monster" that turned out to be the Nautilus. He is next seen during the Island Episode arc of the series. Unlike in the Verne stories, Ayrton is depicted as an intelligent but "dorky" comedy relief character in the anime.
