= Nautilus (fictional submarine) =

Fictional submarine in Jules Verne novels

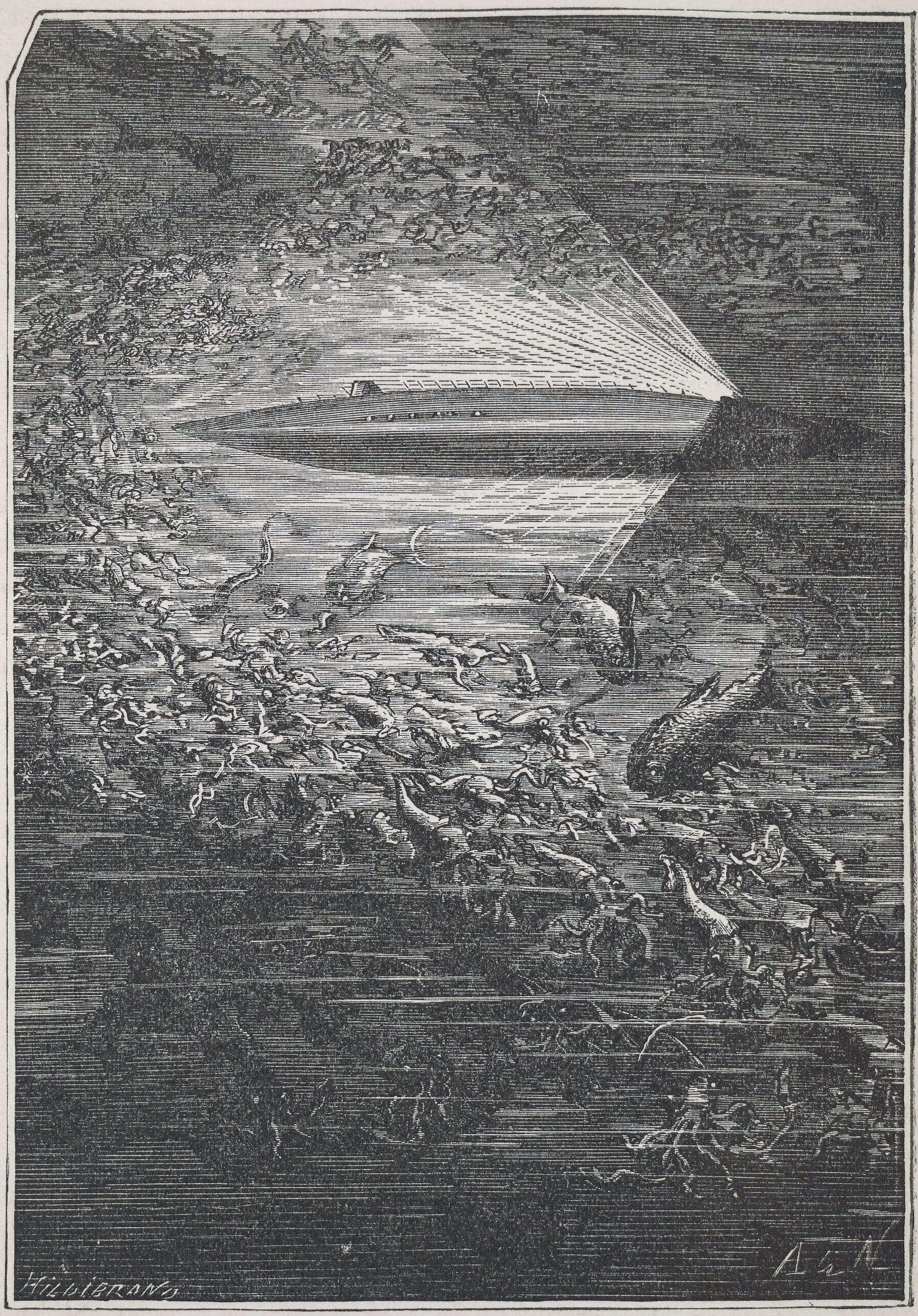
Nautilus under way

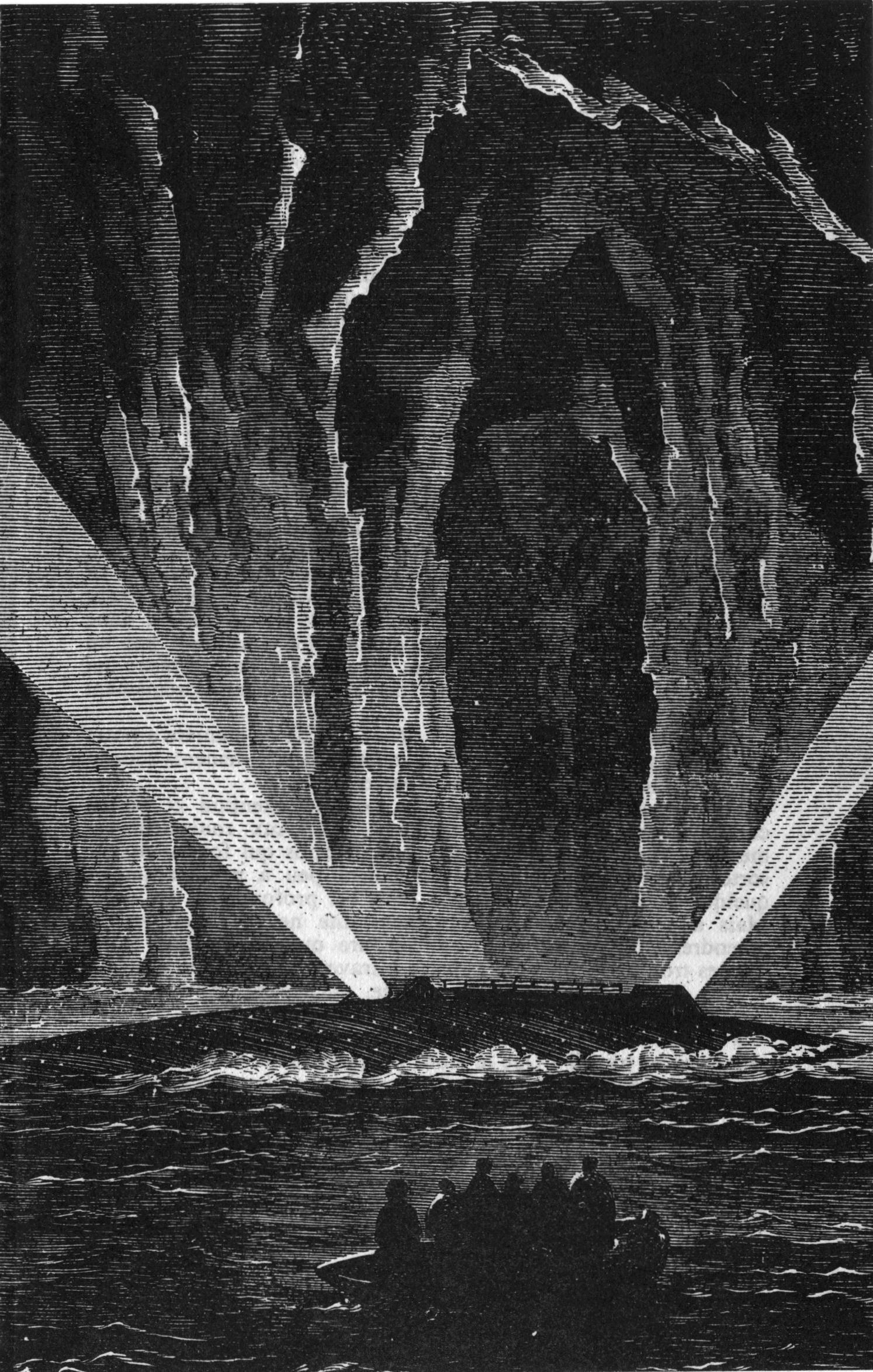
Nautilus, as pictured in The Mysterious Island

Nautilus is the fictional submarine belonging to Captain Nemo featured in Jules Verne's novels Twenty Thousand Leagues Under the Seas (1870) and The Mysterious Island (1875).

== Description ==
Nautilus is described by Verne as "a masterpiece containing masterpieces". It is designed and commanded by Captain Nemo. Electricity provided by sodium/mercury electric batteries (with the sodium provided by extraction from seawater) is the craft's primary power source for propulsion and other services. The energy needed to extract the sodium is provided by coal mined from the sea floor.

Nautilus is double-hulled, and is further separated into water-tight compartments. Its top speed is 50 knots (58 mph). In Captain Nemo's own words:

Here, Professor Aronnax, are the different dimensions of this boat now transporting you. It's a very long cylinder with conical ends. It noticeably takes the shape of a cigar, a shape already adopted in London for several projects of the same kind. The length of this cylinder from end to end is exactly seventy meters, and its maximum breadth of beam is eight meters. So it isn't quite built on the ten–to–one ratio of your high–speed steamers; but its lines are sufficiently long, and their tapering gradual enough, so that the displaced water easily slips past and poses no obstacle to the ship's movements. These two dimensions allow you to obtain, via a simple calculation, the surface area and volume of the Nautilus. Its surface area totals 1,011.45 square meters, its volume 1,507.2 cubic meters—which is tantamount to saying that when it's completely submerged, it displaces 1,500 cubic meters of water, or weighs 1,500 metric tons.

Nautilus uses floodable tanks in order to adjust buoyancy and so control its depth. The pumps that evacuate these tanks of water are so powerful that they produce large jets of water when the vessel emerges rapidly from the surface of the water. This leads many early observers of Nautilus to believe that the vessel is some species of marine mammal, or perhaps a sea monster not yet known to science. To submerge deeply in a short time, Nautilus uses a technique called "hydroplaning", in which the vessel dives down at a steep angle.

Nautilus supports a crew that gathers food from the sea. Nautilus includes a galley for preparing these foods, which includes a machine that makes drinking water from seawater through distillation. Nautilus is not able to refresh its air supply, so Captain Nemo designed it to do this by surfacing and exchanging stale air for fresh, much like a whale. Nautilus is capable of extended voyages without refueling or otherwise restocking supplies. Its maximum dive time is around five days.

Much of the ship is decorated to standards of luxury that are unequalled in a seagoing vessel of the time. These include a library containing about twelve thousand books, with boxed collections of valuable oceanic specimens. The library is also filled with expensive paintings and other works of art. Nautilus also features a lavish dining room and even an organ that Captain Nemo uses to entertain himself in the evening. By comparison, Nemo's personal quarters are very sparsely furnished but do feature duplicates of the bridge instruments so that the captain can keep track of the vessel without being present on the bridge. These amenities however, are only available to Nemo, Professor Aronnax, and his companions.

From her attacks on ships, using a ramming prow to puncture target vessels below the waterline, the world thinks it a sea monster, but later identifies it as an underwater vessel capable of great destructive power, after Abraham Lincoln is attacked and Ned Land strikes the metallic surface of Nautilus with his harpoon.

Its parts were built to order by companies including Creusot and Cail & Co. in France, Pen & Co. and Laird's in England, Scott's in Scotland, Krupp in Prussia, the Motala workshops in Sweden, and Hart Bros. in the United States. Each part was ordered by Nemo anonymously under a different address. Then they were assembled by Nemo's men on a desert island.

== Inspirations ==
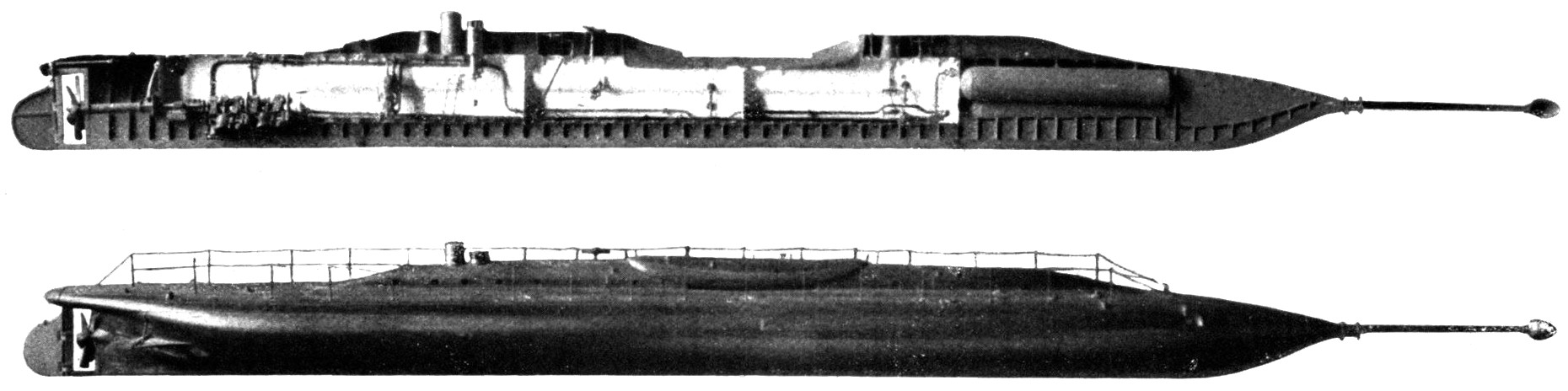
The Plongeur, inspiration for the Nautilus

Verne named the Nautilus after Robert Fulton's real-life submarine Nautilus (1800). For the design of the Nautilus, Verne was inspired by the French Navy submarine Plongeur, a model of which he had seen at the 1867 Exposition Universelle, three years before writing his novel.

Several possible links have been suggested between Captain Nemo's Nautilus and CSS Alabama, a warship built in secrecy for the Confederate States by Laird's shipyard in Birkenhead, UK, during the American Civil War. Verne himself made a comparison between Alabama and Nautilus in a letter to his publisher Pierre-Jules Hetzel in March 1869.

Alabama was sunk in the English Channel by USS Kearsarge; Nemo's final attack is in the English Channel. Both were wholly or partially built in Birkenhead. Also, the Confederate agents who arranged Alabama's construction operated from Nautilus House, a building in Liverpool.

Similarities have also been noted between Captain Nemo and Alabama commander Raphael Semmes. Nemo's motto is Mobilis in Mobile; Semmes was from Mobile, Alabama. Both were gifted natural historians. Semmes was declared a pirate by US President Abraham Lincoln; Nemo was declared a pirate and pursued by USS Abraham Lincoln. Semmes had a portrait of Confederate President Jefferson Davis in his cabin; Nemo had a portrait of Lincoln in his. Both Semmes and Nemo encounter an imaginary island, sail through a patch of white water, encounter fake Havana cigars, mention coral mausoleums, shelter in an extinct volcanic island, and have their final battle off Cherbourg.

== Other appearances ==
Beside their original appearances in Twenty Thousand Leagues Under the Seas and The Mysterious Island, Nautilus and Captain Nemo have appeared in numerous other works.

In the 1954 film adaptation of the first novel and in The Return of Captain Nemo, it is suggested that Nautilus is powered by nuclear energy (discovered by Nemo himself), and that Nemo uses the same energy to destroy Vulcania, Nautilus's base island.

In the 1969 film Captain Nemo and the Underwater City, Nautilus and its sister ship Nautilus II are depicted as industrialised stingray-like vessels, flattened with pronounced tumblehomes supporting rounded deckhouses. Each has a heavy girderwork tail, at the tip of which twin rudders and diving planes are mounted.

In the 1990 anime series Nadia: The Secret of Blue Water, Nautilus is a converted starship of the ancient Atlantis civilisation, with Nemo one of the last surviving Atlantean descendants.

In Alan Moore and Kevin O'Neill's 1999 comic book series The League of Extraordinary Gentlemen, Nautilus features with a squid-like appearance in the comic and a more traditional – albeit extremely tall – submarine in the 2003 film adaptation. Toward the closing stages of the film, antagonist "The Fantom" has stolen Nemo's design and begun construction of multiple submarines dubbed "Nautili" by Skinner. In the film adaptation, the Nautilus is called the "Sword of The Ocean" by Nemo.

In the 2002 Kevin J. Anderson's novel Captain Nemo: The Fantastic History of a Dark Genius, Nautilus appears as a real submarine, apparently cigar-shaped like the one from the novel, built by Nemo for the Ottoman Empire.

The Nautilus appears in Rick Riordan's 2021 novel Daughter of the Deep. This novel is a continuation of 20,000 Leagues Under the Sea, taking place over a century later and featuring a descendant of Captain Nemo as a main character.

== Other Verne submarines ==
Submarines feature in some other of Verne's works. In the 1896 novel Facing the Flag, the pirate Ker Karraje uses an unnamed submarine that acts both as a tug to his schooner Ebba and for ramming and destroying ships which are the targets of his piracy. The same book also features HMS Sword, a small Royal Navy experimental submarine which is sunk after a valiant but unequal struggle with the pirate submarine. In the 1904 book The Master of the World, Robur's secondary vehicle, Terror, is a strange flying machine with submarine, automobile and speedboat capabilities. It briefly eludes naval forces on the Great Lakes by diving.

== Images ==
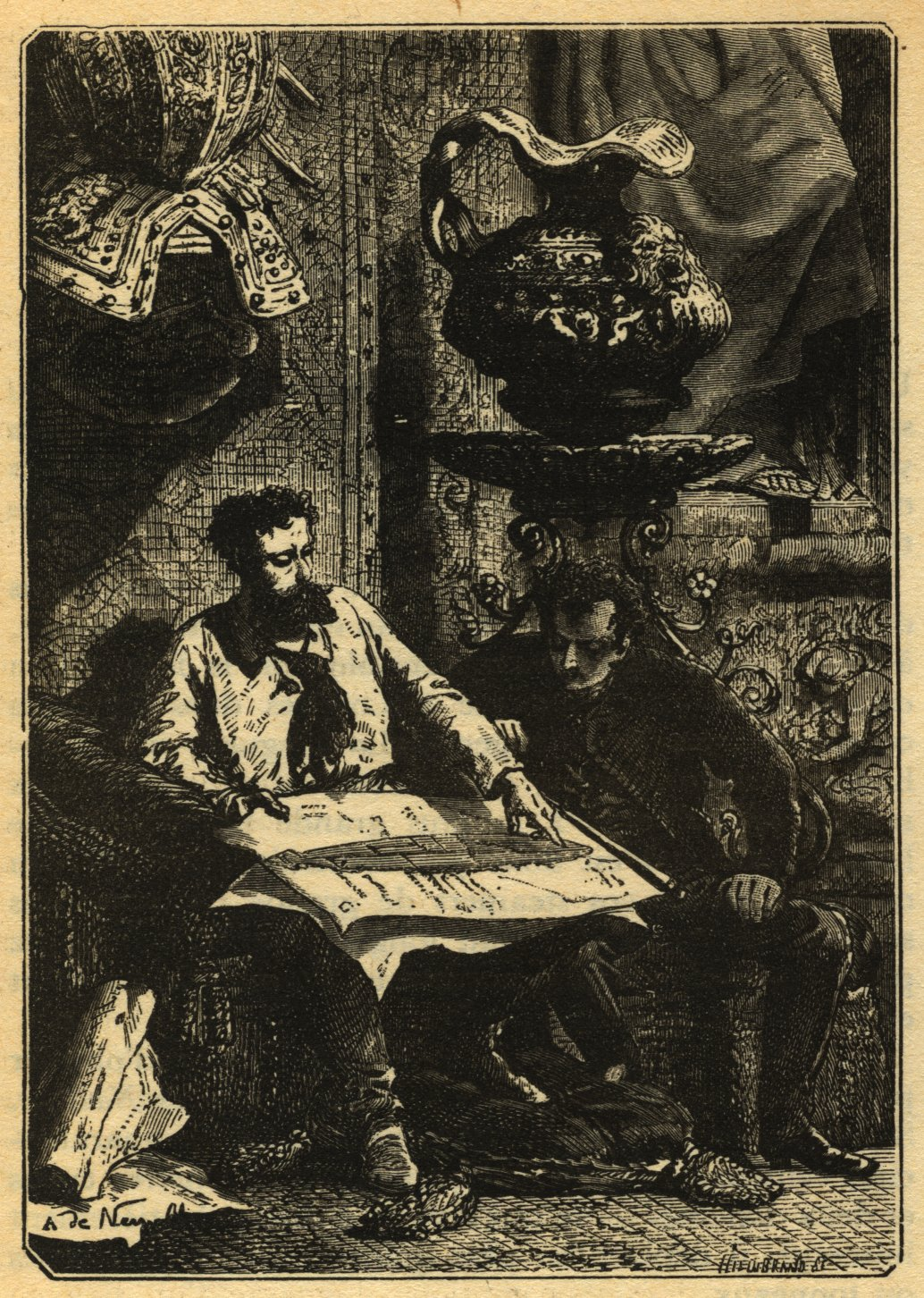
Captain Nemo and Professor Aronnax discussing the plans of Nautilus

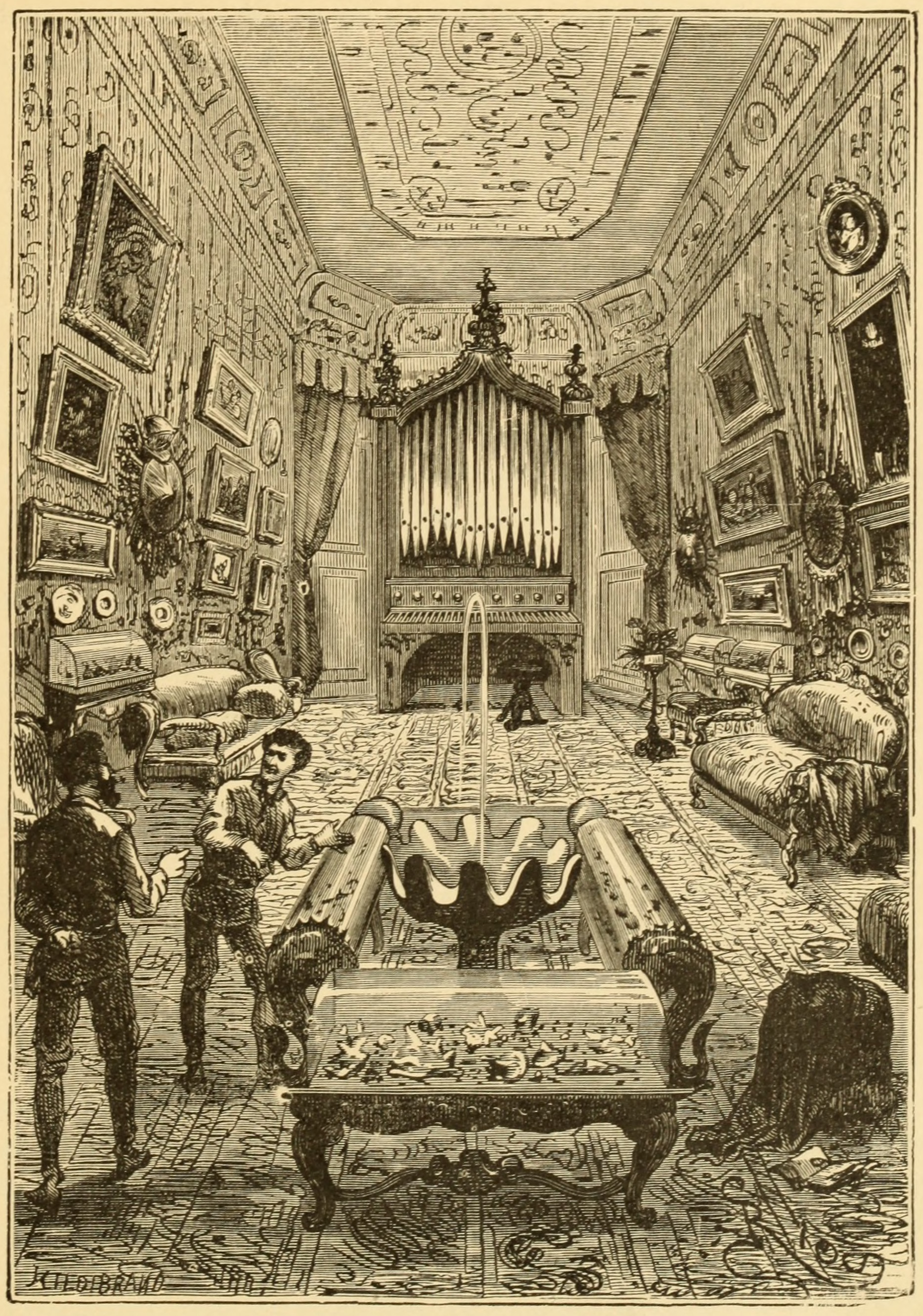
The Grand Salon of Nautilus

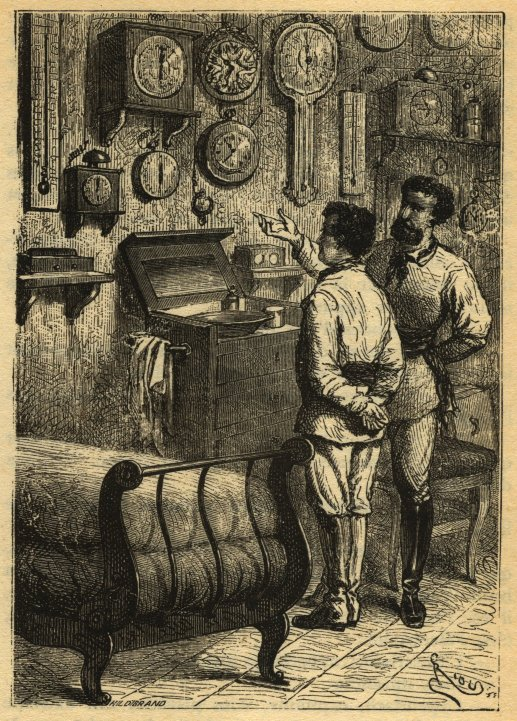
Captain Nemo's room aboard Nautilus

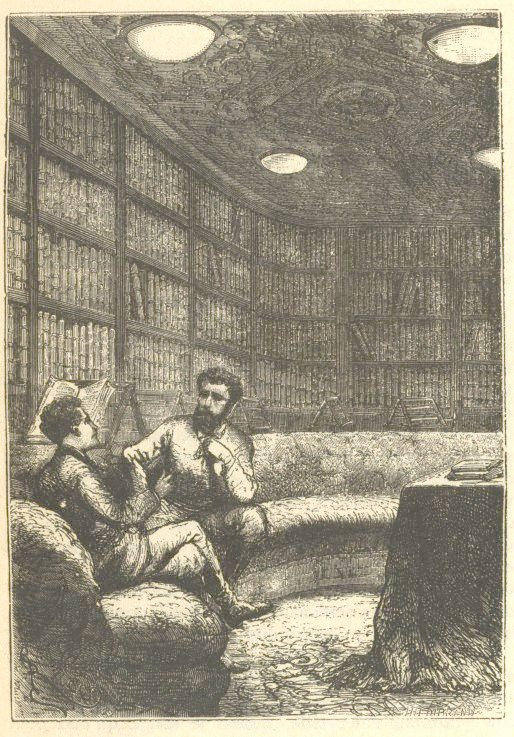
The library of Nautilus

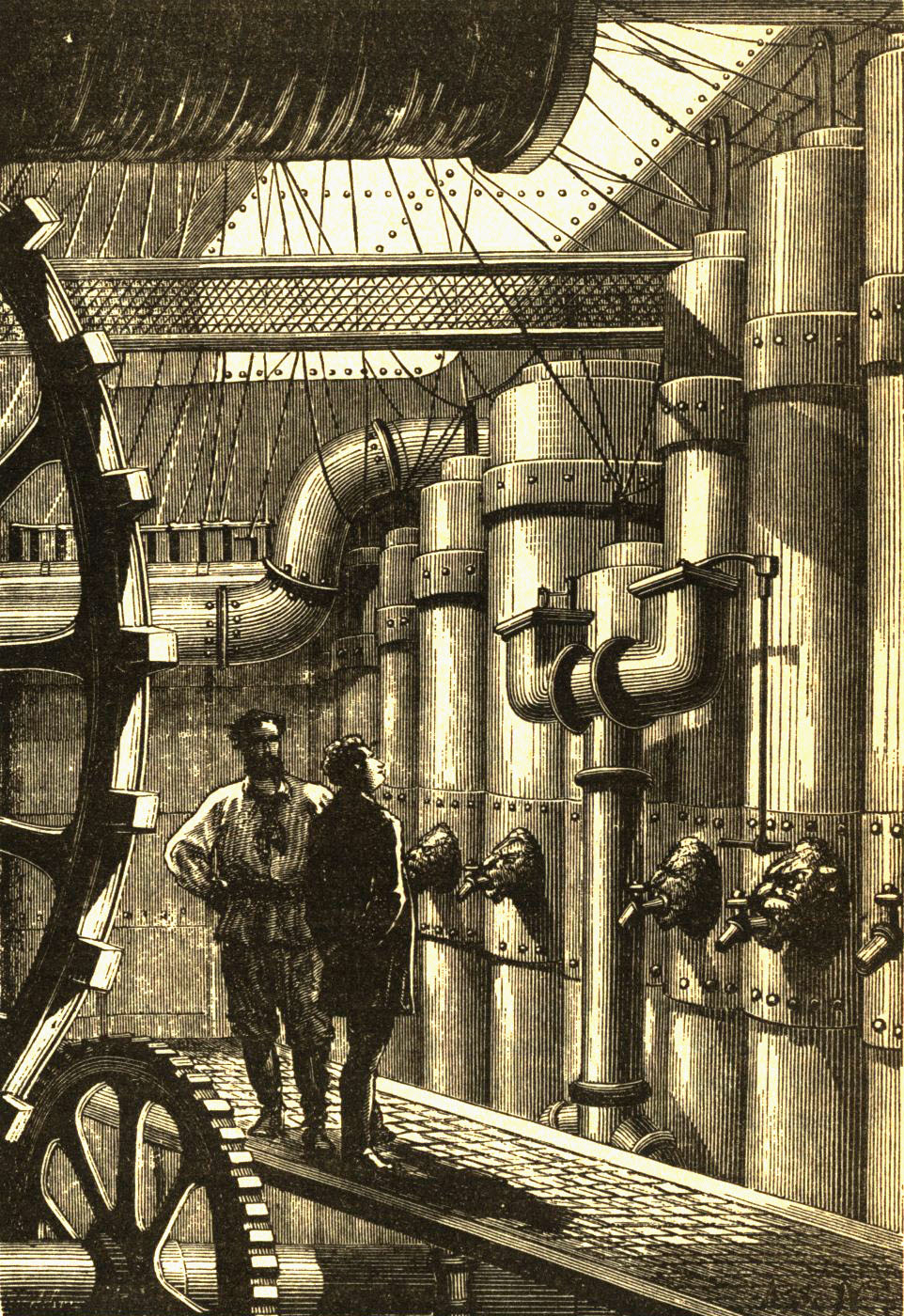
Engine room of Nautilus

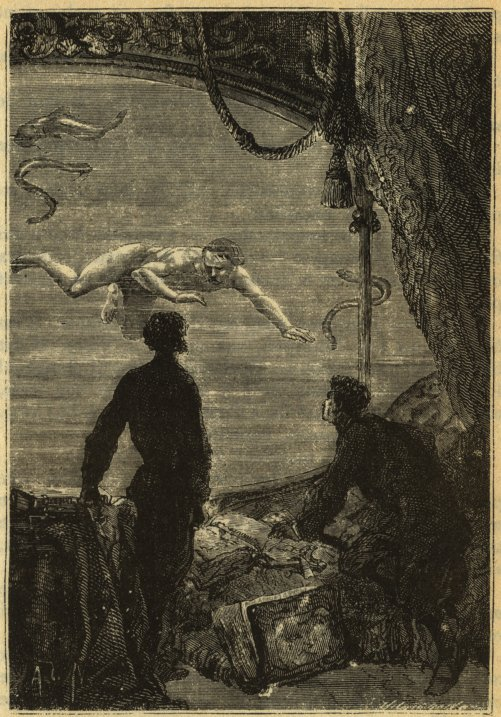
Main window of Nautilus

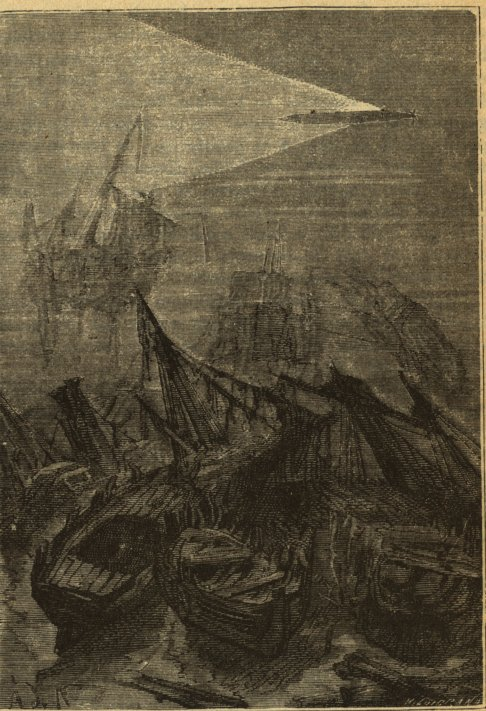
The silhouette of Nautilus in the distance

== See also ==
- List of fictional ships
- List of underwater science fiction works
