= Cyrus Smith =

- Voyages Extraordinaires character
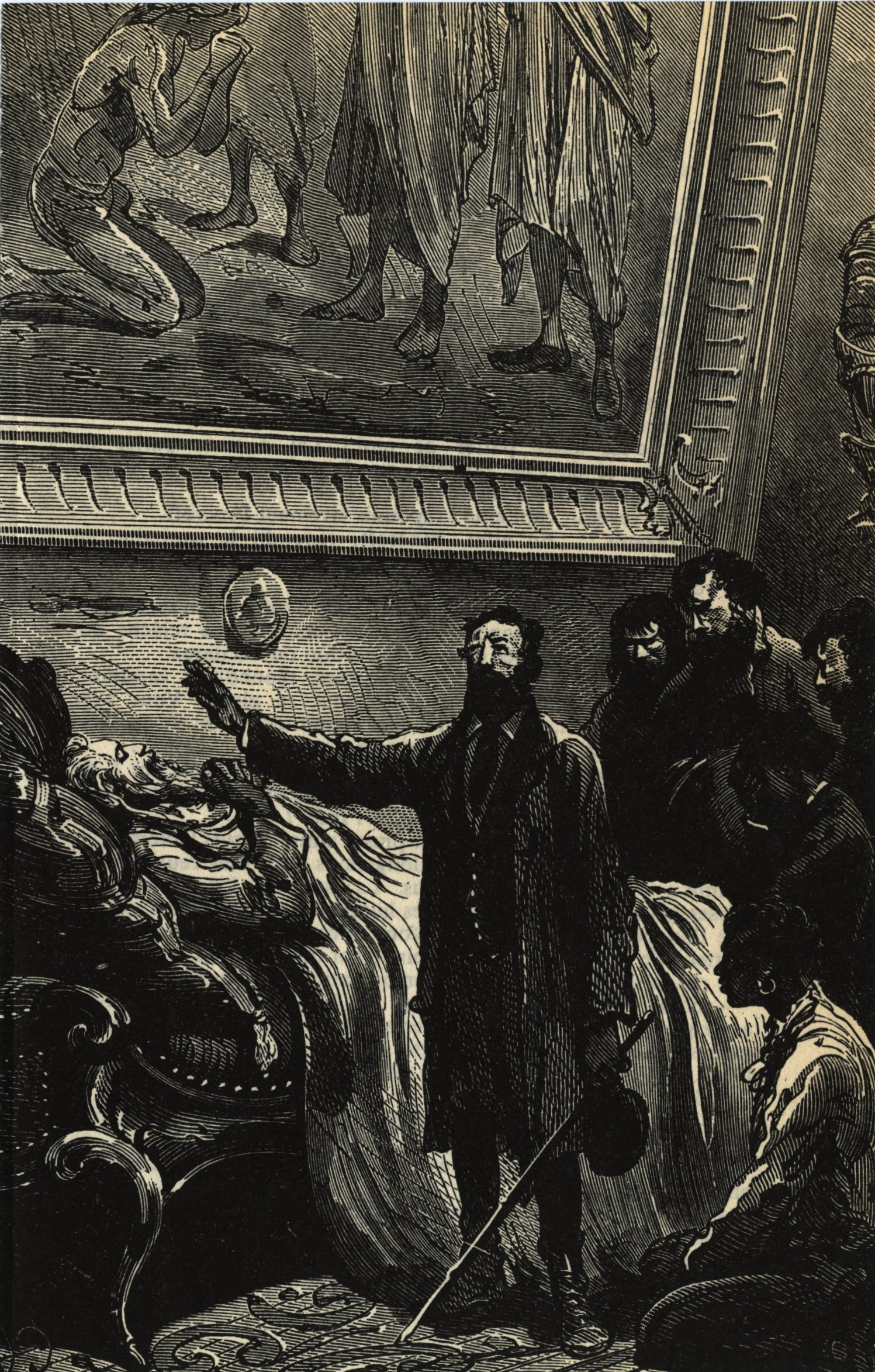
- Cyrus Smith blessing Captain Nemo on his death bed in The Mysterious Island
- Created by: Jules Verne

In-universe information
- Gender: Male
- Occupation: Engineer, USA Army Officer
- Nationality: American

Cyrus Smith (named Cyrus Harding in some English translations) is one of the protagonists of Jules Verne's 1875 novel The Mysterious Island. He is an officer in the Union Army during the American Civil War. He is a very skilled man and a fine literary example of a 19th-century engineer.

Cyrus Smith is also a man possessed of the kind of high moral qualities common in Verne's protagonists. He is selfless, noble, honest, courageous, and utterly devoted to his companions. His practical knowledge of physics, chemistry, botany, navigation, and many other fields enables the Mysterious Island's colonists to quickly establish a thriving mini-civilization in isolation from the rest of the world. Smith is, however, annoyed and secretive regarding the fact that the colony has been mysteriously saved many times by a benefactor who refuses to reveal himself, causing his own achievements to seem less significant.

In the 2002 novel Captain Nemo: The Fantastic History of a Dark Genius by Kevin J. Anderson, he is one of the officials captured by Robur (another Verne creation, from the novels Robur the Conqueror and Master of the World) during the Crimean War, along with Captain Nemo and Passepartout.
