= OceanX =

Ocean exploration company

- Trade name: OceanX
- Type: Nonprofit
- Industry: Philanthropy; Media
- Founded: 2016
- Founders: Ray Dalio and Mark Dalio
- Headquarters: United States
- Key people: Vincent Pieribone (Co-CEO, Chief Scientist); Mark Dalio (Co-CEO, Creative Director)
- Owner: Dalio Philanthopies
- Number of employees: 250+ (2025)
- Website: oceanx.org

OceanX is a nonprofit ocean exploration initiative founded in 2016 by billionaire investor Ray Dalio, founder of Bridgewater Associates, and his son, Mark Dalio.

OceanX is led by co-CEOs Mark Dalio and Vincent Pieribone, who assumed their roles in 2022. Mark Dalio, also the organization’s Creative Director since its inception, is a filmmaker and former associate producer at National Geographic, where he developed a passion for ocean storytelling. His vision for OceanX emphasizes vivid cinematography to inspire global audiences, drawing from his experience producing content like the Emmy-nominated Oceans: Our Blue Planet.

Vincent Pieribone, co-CEO and Chief Scientist, is a professor of cellular and molecular physiology and neuroscience at Yale School of Medicine and a fellow at the John B. Pierce Laboratory. With over 15 years of ocean research experience, Pieribone specializes in bioluminescence and brain activity measurement using marine-derived proteins, and he has led global expeditions and founded pharmaceutical and diagnostic companies. Pieribone joined OceanX as Vice Chairman in 2016 before becoming co-CEO.

== Vessels ==
OceanX's first vessel was the MV Alucia, a 56-meter research and exploration vessel purchased in 2011. The ship was outfitted with two deep-sea submersibles, a helipad, laboratories, and media facilities.

In 2021, the Alucia was sold and replaced by OceanX's flagship 87-meter OceanXplorer, a former oil exploration ship previously named Volstad Surveyor. The OceanXplorer is equipped with submersibles, laboratories, and media facilities to support its mission of mapping uncharted ocean areas, studying marine life, and sharing discoveries through captivating storytelling. OceanX collaborates with leading scientific institutions, media entities, and philanthropic partners, including the Woods Hole Oceanographic Institution, National Geographic Society, and BBC Studios.

== OceanX Media ==
OceanX Media (formerly Alucia Productions) is the media production arm of OceanX. OceanX Media worked with BBC Earth on the nature documentary series Blue Planet II, taking BBC Studios on nine missions that contributed to four episodes of the series, including Episode 2, The Deep, in which OceanX and the BBC conducted the first ever deep-sea submersible dives to the Antarctic seafloor. The episode was nominated for a Primetime Emmy Award for Outstanding Cinematography for a Nonfiction Program. A video from the dive won the Webby Award in Social: Education and Discovery in 2019. This video was directed by OceanX Media Creative Director Mark Dalio.

Alongside BBC Earth, OceanX Media co-produced Oceans: Our Blue Planet, the Giant Screen companion film to Blue Planet II. The film is sponsored by Microsoft.

OceanX Media content has also been featured in media outlets including Mashable, Business Insider, Scientific American, Earther, Discovery Channel Canada, and National Geographic.

== Accomplishments ==
OceanX missions and missions aboard the MV Alucia have been responsible for:

- Exploring the Great Barrier Reef with Sir David Attenborough for the series Great Barrier Reef (2015).
- Exploring the ocean’s blue holes for the National Geographic channel series Years of Living Dangerously (2014-2016).
- Discovery of the Baltic Sea anomaly in the Gulf of Bothnia (June 2011).
- The first-ever open-water test of Orpheus, a deep-seadrone prototype developed by the Woods Hole Oceanographic Institution and NASA's Jet Propulsion Laboratory (JPL), to explore the deep water hadal zone.

== Partners ==
In addition to its internal science and media operations, OceanX partners with several media, science and philanthropy organizations to facilitate and support their ocean research. Its partners include the American Museum of Natural History, BBC Studios, filmmaker James Cameron, photographer Paul Nicklen, the Woods Hole Oceanographic Institution, explorer Sylvia Earle, and scientists Edith Widder and Samantha Joye.

OceanX co-created the #OurBluePlanet digital initiative with BBC Earth with the goal of getting 1 billion people talking about the oceans.

In 2018, OceanX partnered with Bloomberg Philanthropies to commit $185 million over four years to ocean exploration and protection efforts.

In December 2023, OceanX announced a research collaboration with Konservasi Indonesia to support Blue Halo S, a marine‑management programme targeting Indonesia’s Fisheries Management Area 572.

== External Sites ==
- Official Site
