= Kyoichi Mori =

Japanese whale watcher

Kyoichi Mori (Japanese: 森 恭一 Mori Kyoichi) is a Japanese whale watcher who assisted Tsunemi Kubodera in taking the first photographs of a living giant squid in its natural habitat. He is a member of the Ogasawara Whale Watching Association and specialises is sperm whales.

== Giant squid ==
In late 2002, Tsunemi Kubodera came to Chichi-jima, a part of the Bonin Islands archipelago, with the desire to film the giant squid alive in its natural habitat. Kyoichi, a native of Chichi-jima was able to provide locations of sperm whales that he had tracked, and, since sperm whales are known to feed on giant squid, the belief was that they could follow the whales to the squid. Kudobera and Mori succeeded in taking the first photographs of a living giant squid in its natural habitat on September 30, 2004.
