= Justin Marshall (disambiguation) =

Justin Marshall (born 1973) is a former New Zealand rugby union player.

Justin Marshall may also refer to:

- Justin Marshall (curler) (born 1986), American wheelchair curler
- Justin Marshall (neuroscientist) (born 1962), British-Australian neuroscientist-ecologist
