= Tsunemi Kubodera =

Japanese zoologist (born 1951)

Tsunemi Kubodera (窪寺 恒己, Kubodera Tsunemi; born 1951 in Nakano, Tokyo) is a Japanese zoologist with the National Museum of Nature and Science. On September 30, 2004, Kubodera and his team became the first people to photograph a live giant squid in its natural habitat. Two years later, on December 4, 2006, he also managed to successfully film a live adult giant squid for the first time ever. On July 10, 2012, Kubodera, together with Steve O'Shea and Edith Widder, became the first to film a live giant squid in its natural habitat from a submersible off the Bonin Islands.

In addition to these firsts involving the giant squid, in 2005, Kubodera also became the first to film the Dana octopus squid (Taningia danae) in its natural habitat.

== Finding the giant squid ==
With his partner Kyoichi Mori of the Ogasawara Whale Watching Association, Kubodera captured photos of the elusive giant squid with his special cameras, after three years of attempts. Relying on the paths of sperm whales, the pair found suitable location to deploy their equipment. The cameras, which were able to store 600 photos, were programmed to flash and take a picture every 30 seconds. Tsunemi's hope was that one of these pictures would contain a photograph of the giant squid. The camera was mounted on a line that used two hooks. To this line Kubodera attached two cuttlefish as bait. The line was then lowered to 900 metres (3,000 ft). A giant squid came by, took the bait, and got caught on one of the hook traps. The squid spent 4 hours and 13 minutes trying to get free before severing one of its tentacles and fleeing. The tentacle was still moving when the camera was hauled up.

The resulting photographs have helped scientists dramatically improve their understanding of giant squid behavior. For example, the squid showed a more aggressive hunting style than scientists had expected.

== In media ==
Kubodera had a segment on the Discovery Channel's special program about the giant squid.
