= Archie the giant squid =

Giant squid specimen caught in 2004

Archie the giant squid is an 8.62 meter (28.3 ft) long, preserved female giant squid in the London Natural History Museum Spirit Collection, as a display and as a specimen. Her name "Archie" is short for Architeuthis dux, the Latin name for the giant squid. She is not considered fully grown, as giant squid can grow up to 13 or 14 meters long. She has 8 shorter arms covered with serrated suction cups and 2 longer feeding tentacles. When attempting to weigh her, Archie broke the museum's scales, so her weight is estimated somewhere upwards of 200 kg. Archie is held in a custom acrylic 9-meter transparent tank filled with a 10% solution of formol-saline, which is a mix between salt water and formolin. She is the biggest fluid-preserved specimen at the museum.

== Background ==
This Architeuthis dux was caught off of the Falkland Islands in March 2004, by a fishing trawler at a depth of 220 meters. Her catch was considered extremely rare because most discovered remains of giant squid are fragments and not entire specimen. Archie died soon after capture and was immediately frozen in a tank in the Natural History Museum while her custom tank was constructed. While frozen, DNA tests were conducted to furthermore confirm Archie as an Architeuthis dux. Museum curator John Ablett organized her preservation and storage in 2004.

When defrosting Archie, it "was a vigorous regime of keeping the tentacles frozen with ice packs while hosing down the mantle area". It took around 3 days to fully defrost it, before being injected with formol-saline.

Archie's custom tank was designed by the same designers who created preservation tanks for Damien Hirst's works.

It was put on display on 1 March 2006 at the Darwin Centre.
