= A Life Illuminated =

2025 documentary film about Dr. Edith Widder

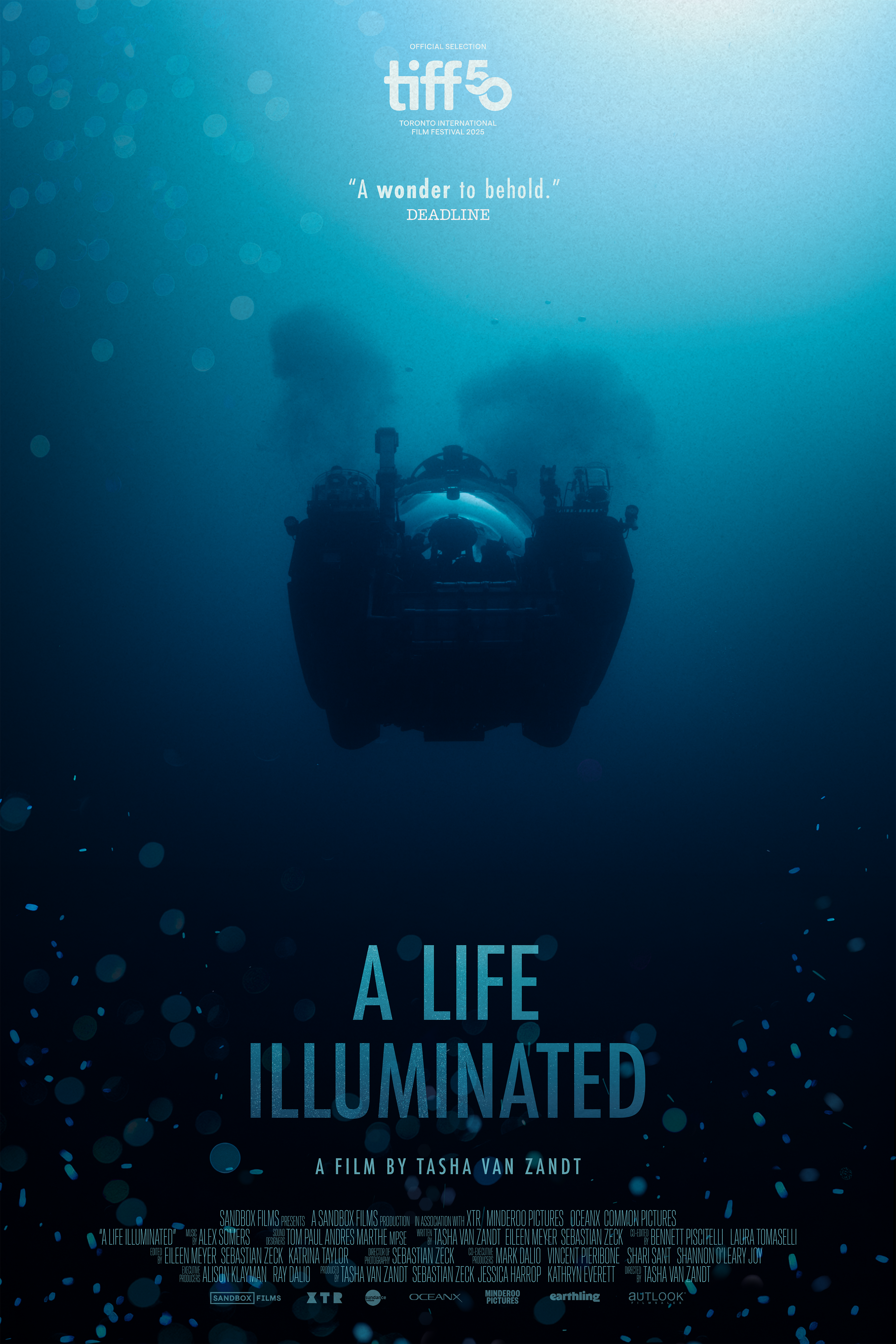
- Directed by: Tasha Van Zandt
- Produced by: Tasha Van Zandt; Sebastian Zeck; Jessica Harrop; Kathryn Everett
- Starring: Dr. Edith Widder
- Edited by: Eileen Meyer; Sebastian Zeck; Katrina Taylor
- Music by: Alex Somers
- Production company: Sandbox Films
- Release date: September 7, 2025 (TIFF)
- Running time: 89 minutes
- Country: United States
- Language: English

A Life Illuminated is a 2025 American documentary film, directed and produced by Tasha Van Zandt. The film follows the life and career of pioneering marine biologist and deep sea explorer Dr. Edith Widder as she descends 3,300 feet to the bottom of the ocean on an expedition in search of one of the greatest bioluminescent mysteries on our planet.

The film had its world premiere at the 2025 Toronto International Film Festival.

== Production ==
The film is directed by award-winning director Tasha Van Zandt, and produced by the Oscar-nominated team behind Fire of Love (2022), Sandbox Films.

== Reception ==
Pat Mullen of POV Magazine wrote of the film, "A Life Illuminated takes audiences to profound depths of human discovery as Dr. Widder lets us experience the world anew through her research. This spectacular adventure reminds one of how small we are in the ocean of life, and all we can do is marvel at the complexity of the world before our eyes... It's a testament to the best of documentaries when they transport audiences to uncharted waters. However, the case is doubly impressive for A Life Illuminated, which brings viewers to new depths both literally and figuratively. This outstanding underwater adventure follows in the great tradition of films like Le Monde du silence by venturing into the depths of the ocean with a great mind who pioneered exploration of the vast world beneath the oceans’ surface."

Kate Erbland of IndieWire wrote, "a classic, stick-to-your ribs documentary experience about a fascinating person... In following Dr. Widder's journey, we learn how much even a single good shot of bioluminescent activity is valued. By the time the film ends, we are treated to the whole fireworks display. Illuminating, absolutely."

Andy Howell of Film Threat wrote, "A Life Illuminated is an incredible film. It takes us to one of the most extreme places on Earth, it reveals previously unseen phenomena, it takes us on the journey of scientific discovery, and it is an inspiration."

Jason Gorber of RogerEbert.com wrote of the film, “A Life Illuminated is a treasure, highlighting the remarkable career of an underwater scientist who is finally given a chance in the spotlight herself."

LAIst listed A Life Illuminated as a critics' standout film from the 50th Toronto International Film Festival.

The film was award the best science documentary at DOCVILLE 2026. The jury report read: This film presents the story of an inspiring but probably little-known researcher that was driven by a lifelong conviction that she could make a difference in how people see the world. Its stunning visuals combine with a story that that is at once deeply personal but equally driven by scientific curiosity. Her readiness to be “willing to fail” leads her finally to ultimate success, which we hope will inspire young people who want to pursue a scientific career. The film gives much needed attention to the challenges that female scientists face and the hardships that they encounter throughout their careers.
