= Justin Marshall (neuroscientist) =

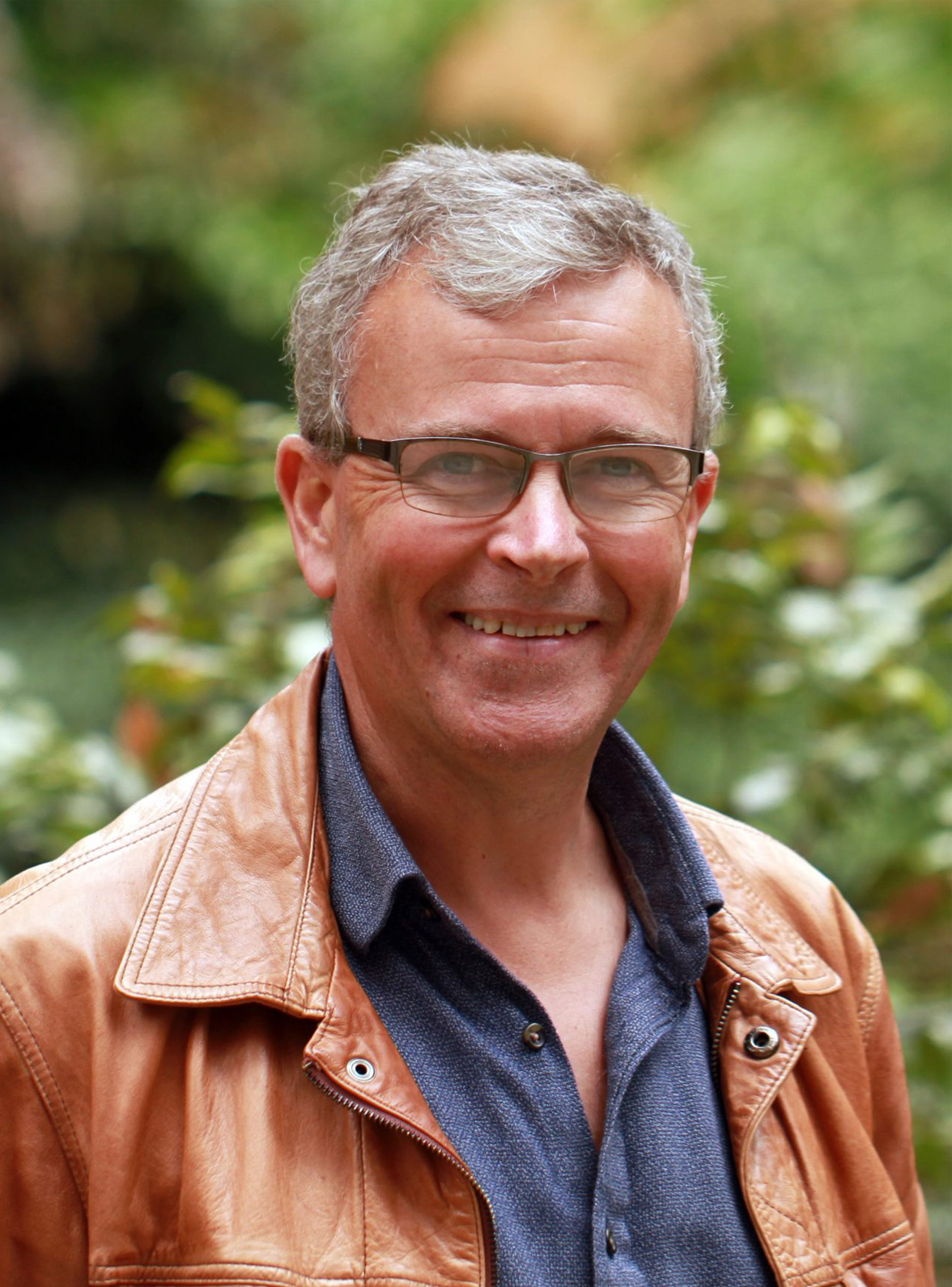
Professor Justin Marshall

Nicholas Justin Marshall FAA (born 1962) is a British-Australian neuroscientist-ecologist whose research focuses on decoding how animals use colour to communicate. He is known for discovering the most complex animal visual system known of any organism. – that of the mantis shrimp, which has 12 colour channels.

== Education and early life ==
Marshall's parents were both marine scientists; his father was Her Majesty's Curator of Fish at the British Museum of Natural History, and his mother was a natural history illustrator of marine organisms. His early exposure as a child to marine animals and environments led to his love of marine biology.

Marshall attended high school in Cambridge and studied a Bachelor of Science in zoology, graduating with 1st class honors from the University of Sussex, UK in 1985. He completed his PhD in the neurobiology of vision in mantis shrimps at the University of Sussex, UK in 1996.

== Career and research ==
Marshall's research focuses on neuroethology, understanding how animals perceive their environment, and also how the brains and sensory systems of animals in the real world have been shaped by their environment and needs, particularly their visual systems.

His study of the mantis shrimp revealed it has the world's most complex visual system of any known animal, with 12-channel colour channels. His research also showed that octopus and other cephalopods are colour blind.

He showed that mantis shrimp and cuttlefish can reflect and detect circular polarised light, which is closely linked to covert communication. This research is being used to design new generation polarisation cameras and other optical devices.

He has made discoveries in colour vision in several other animal groups, such as marine and freshwater fish, cephalopods, birds, lizards and crabs. In 2017, his lab uncovered a new type of eye cell in deep-sea fish, a 'rod-like cone' specialised for dimly lit environments.

Marshall has also worked in the deep sea, contributing to the design of the MV Alucia research vessel. His research student Wen-Sung Chung was the first person in the world to see a giant squid in its natural habitat in July 2012, via a video cameras set up by Japanese broadcaster NHK.

Marshall is also a marine biologist and began the citizen science/outreach program CoralWatch in 2002. One of his PhD students at the time developed the 'coral health chart', a colour-coded chart to observe the health of corals seen when diving or snorkeling. The program is in 78 countries and has more than 3500 members; more than 8000 coral surveys have been conducted.

Marshall has contributed to more than 50 documentaries, including National Geographic, and BBC Blue-chip productions, and Chasing Coral on Netflix. He was worked with Sir David Attenborough on several series including the 2015 Great Barrier Reef series as chief science consultant. Marshall featured alongside Attenborough in a submersible vessel in the 360 VR production relating to that series

== Awards and honors ==
- Professor, Queensland Brain Institute at The University of Queensland
- Affiliated Professor, School of Biomedical Sciences, UQ
- Affiliated Professor, Biological Sciences, UQ
- President Australian Coral Reef Society 2008–2010
- ARC QEII Research Fellow 1996–2001
- L'Oreal Art and Science Award 2001
- UQ Vice Chancellors Excellence Award 2001
- Honorary board member of ProjectAWARE
- Advisory Board for ORCA, USA
- ARC (Australian Research Council) Laureate Fellow
- Vice Chancellor's Senior Research Fellow, The University of Queensland
- 2015 PROSE Award in Textbook/Biological & Life Sciences by the Association of American Publishers for Visual Ecology
- 2016 IEEE award for bioinspired engineering
- 2020 Fellow of the Australian Academy of Science

== Underwater research ==
Marshall has logged more than 1000 diving hours and twice lived underwater for 10 consecutive days in the Aquarius laboratory.
