= French corvette Alecton =

Ship which encountered a giant squid

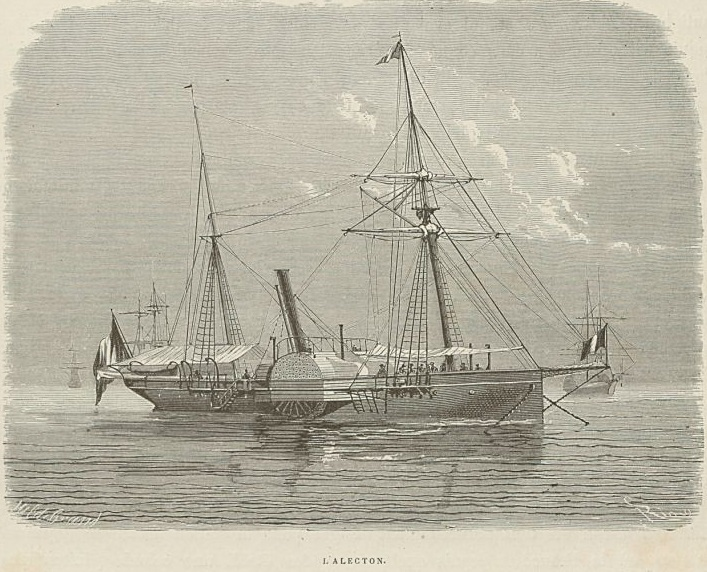
- The French aviso Alecton, launched 1861. —Frédéric Bouyer (1866/1867) (text). Édouard Riou (illustr.) after Rodolphe.

History

France
- Name: Alecton
- Laid down: 1859
- Launched: 1861
- Fate: Decommissioned 10 August 1883 and scrapped in 1884 at Lorient

General characteristics
- Class & type: Alecton class
- Displacement: 570 tonnes
- Length: 50.9 m
- Beam: 12.1 m
- Draught: 2.7 m
- Propulsion: 120 hp steam engine and sails on two masts
- Complement: 66
- Armament: two light cannon

The French corvette Alecton was a ship in the French Navy in the 19th century. She is most famous for having been one of the first surface vessels recorded to have encountered a giant squid (Architeuthis). Until this time, giant squid were viewed as mythical creatures.

== Service history ==
The Alecton, named after Alecto, one of the three Furies, was a paddle wheeler (aviso à roues de deuxième classe, type Étoile modifié) laid down in 1859 at the La Seyne shipyard of the Société des Forges et Chantiers de la Mediterranée and launched in 1861. She had a length of 50.9 metres and a beam of 12.1 metres. Alecton was powered by both a 120 hp steam engine and sails on two masts, had a crew of sixty-six and an armament of two light cannons. Her displacement was 570 tonnes. Alecton was first stationed at French Guiana and from 1868 onwards at Guadeloupe. She was decommissioned on 10 August 1883 and scrapped in 1884 at Lorient.

== Bouyer's travelogue ==
Frédéric Bouyer who served as captain on the Alecton wrote a travelogue, which first appeared as an article in Le Tour du Monde in 1866, later published as a book, La Guyane française: notes et souvenirs d'un voyage exécuté en 1862-1863 (1867).

These carried illustrations done by artists based on sketches made by officers on the Alecton and Bouyer himself. The illustration of the ship was by Édouard Riou, based on the sketch by E. Rodolphe, the ship-of-the-line ensign (enseigne de vaisseau) (Note: The enseigne de vaisseau was first officer.) aboard Alecton. (Note: "E. Rodolphe" according to Frédol aka Moquin-Tandon.)

The encounter with the giant squid occurred in 1861 when the boat was under his command.

== Giant squid encounter ==
Alecton attempts to capture squid;
near Tenerife, November 1861

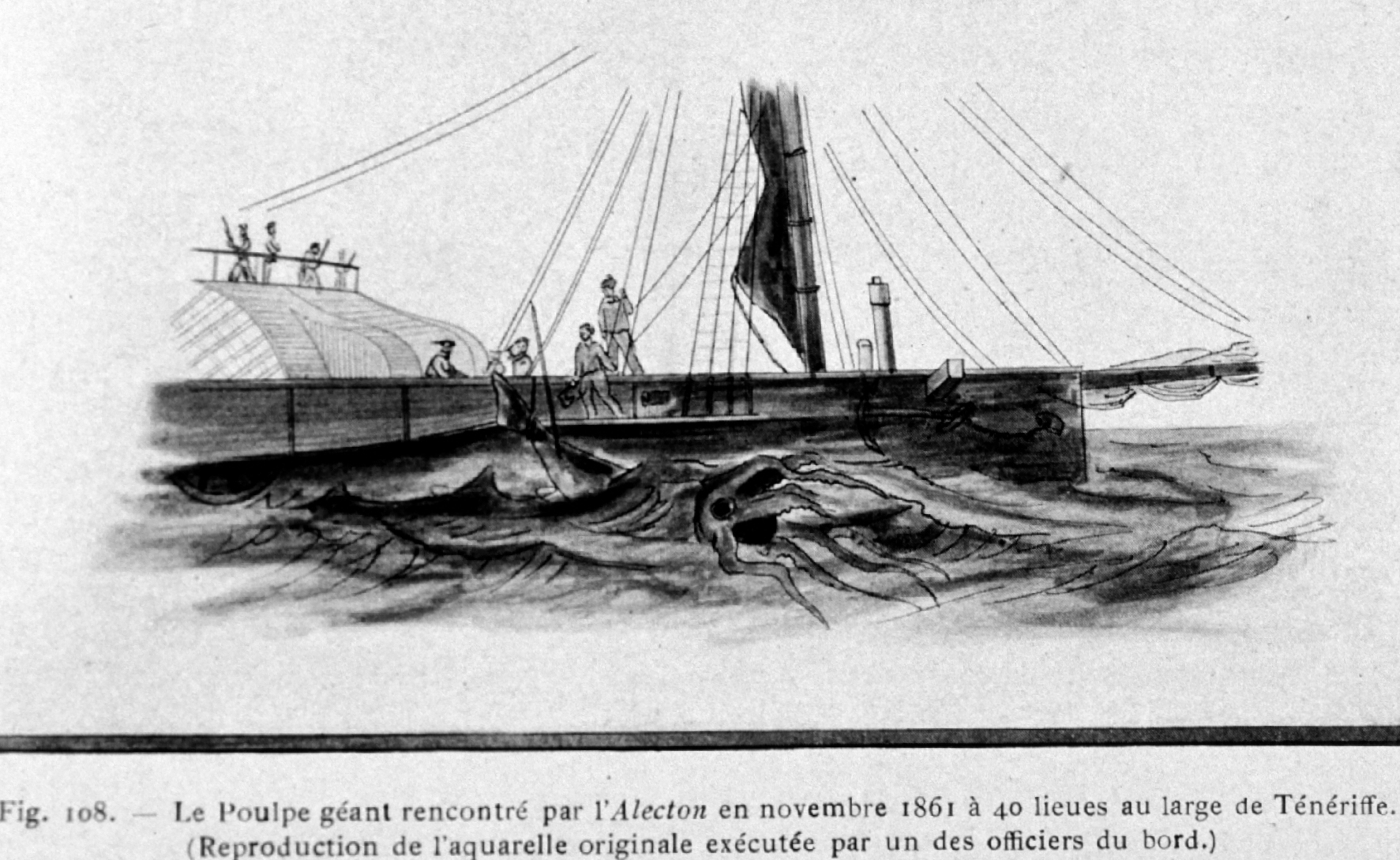
—Original watercolour by Rodolphe, 1861 (Reproduction)

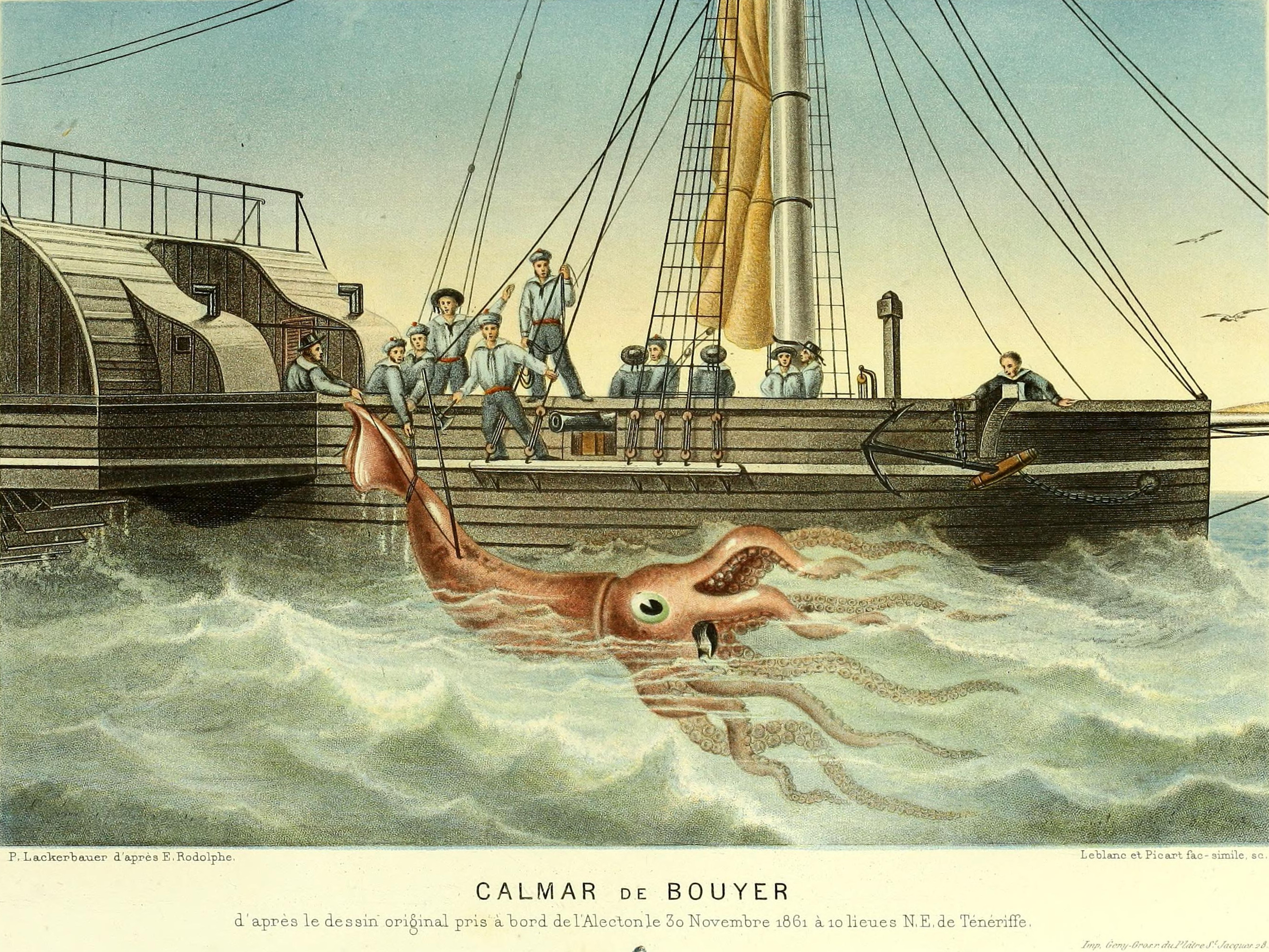
—Pierre Lackerbauer (after E. Rodolphe), 1865

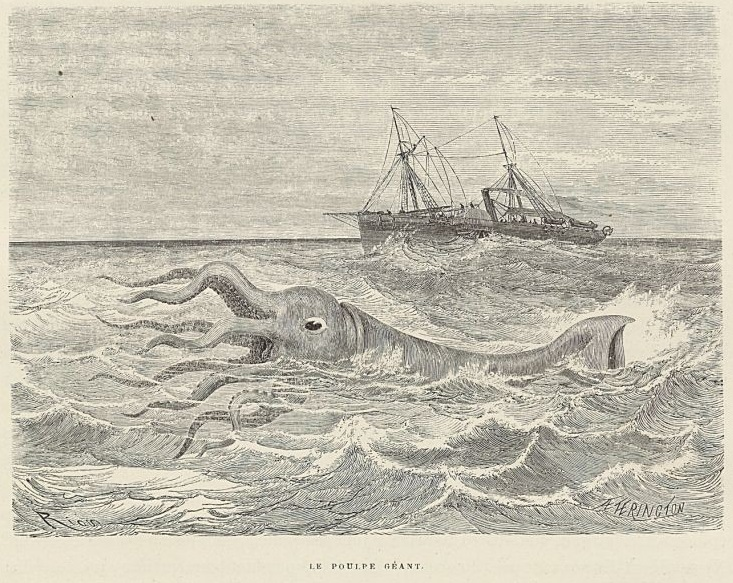
—Frédéric Bouyer, 1866/1867 (text). Édouard Riou (illustr.) after Rodolphe.

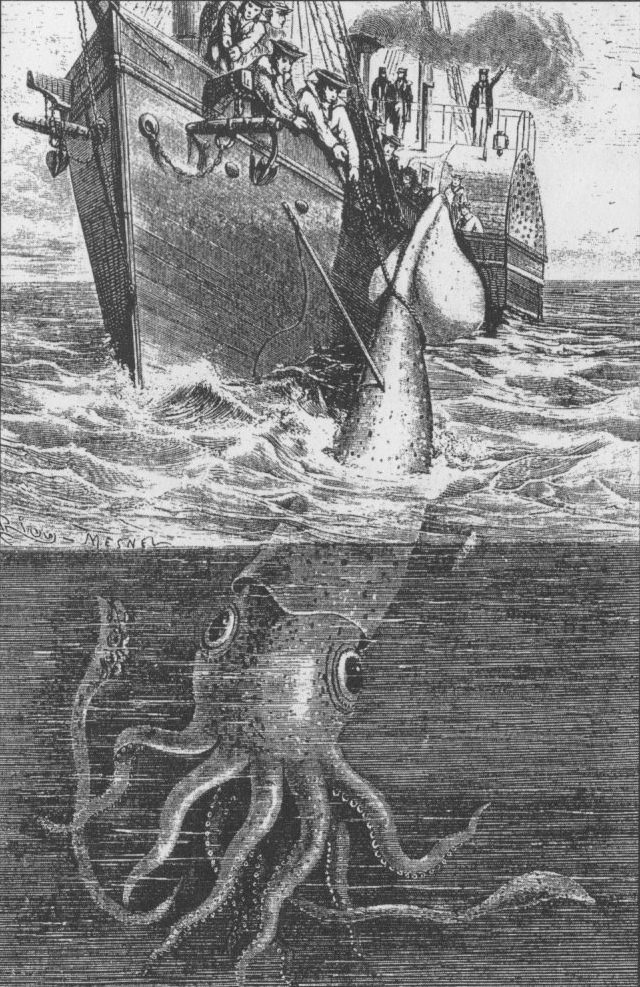
—(Originally in): Figuier, Louis, 1866
(Reused by): Lee, Henry, 1884

Paintings depict the gigantic squid, harpooned and attempted to be hauled aboard.

On November 30, or November 17, 1861 the French corvette Alecton was on its way to Cayenne, navigating near Tenerife, the largest and most populous island of the seven Canary Islands. As the ship neared the island the lookout on duty yelled to the crew below: “a large body, partly submerged, on the surface”. The captain, Frédéric Bouyer, himself would later describe the monster as a "gigantic squid" (French: encornet gigantesque).

The captain had heard reports of giant squid but the scientific community disputed their existence. Mutilated, decomposed pieces of giant squid had surfaced, most notably off Zealand, Denmark in 1847, and another at The Skaw in 1854. Yet no one had ever captured or seen a live specimen. Resolved to capture the monster, the captain ordered the ship to fire muskets, launch harpoons, and try to ensnare the squid with a noose.

The bullets seemed to do little damage to the squid's rubbery body, (Note: Capt. Bouyer himself says muskets (fusils) and "bullets" according to Henry Lee in 1884 is consistent as opposed to "cannon" written by Willy Ley in 1941.) estimated at up to 18 feet (5.5 m) in length from "head to tail" (excluding the length of arms). Finally they managed to lasso a rope around its body. However, the weight was so great that when they tried to haul it aboard, the squid's body was torn and only the tip of the tail remained aboard, which weighed 14 kg according to the captain.

== Twenty Thousand Leagues Under the Seas ==
The Alecton encounter of 1861 was the inspiration for the giant squids attacking the submarine in Twenty Thousand Leagues Under the Seas, a classic science fiction novel by French writer Jules Verne, published in 1870. Verne ascribed vicious behavior to the giant squid to paint it as a monster of legend, and the physical descriptions did not square with the living creature.
