= Kathy Townsend =

Canadian born Australian marine biologist

- Education: University of Queensland
- Occupation: Academic marine biologist
- Employer: University of Queensland
- Website: www.biology.uq.edu.au/staff/kathy-townsend

Dr. Kathy Townsend is an academic marine biologist at the University of Queensland (UQ), Australia.

== Early life ==
Kathy Townsend was born in Calgary, Alberta, Canada. She enrolled in the University of Calgary in 1990, before moving to Australia in 1991 to pursue marine biology studies at the University of Queensland. She credits the Jacques Cousteau documentaries as the inspiration for her passion for marine biology.

== Career ==
Townsend obtained her BSc and PhD, both in marine biology, from UQ. She is best known for her work on manta rays, the ecology of coral reefs, and the impact of ingested marine rubbish on sea turtles, with particular reference to Queensland's marine environments and organisms. She also works with the Earthwatch Institute.

Townsend assisted in the production of, and appeared in, David Attenborough's series Great Barrier Reef.

== Awards ==
Townsend's awards include:

- 2005: University of Queensland General Staff Award
- 2007: NAIDOC Award
- January 2010: Goldring Marine Emerging Scientist Fellowship
- February 2010: Nominated for “Australian Day Award” for services to the Environment
- October 2010: Peter Doherty Award for Excellence in Science and Science Education
