= Scott Cassell =

American underwater filmmaker

- Born: March 16, 1962 (age 63); Los Angeles County, California, U.S.
- Occupation(s): Explorer, underwater filmmaker, counter-terrorism operative
- Known for: World record for longest distance traveled by a diver

Scott J. Cassell (born March 16, 1962) is an American explorer, underwater filmmaker and counter-terrorism operative. His documentary credits include over thirty-five programs for the Disney Channel, MTV (Wildboyz), Spike TV, the Discovery Channel, Animal Planet, the Space, the BBC and the History Channel. He has over 13,000 hours as a diver, and is a United States Coast Guard-qualified submersible pilot, with over 900 dives in the 'SeaMagine SeaMobile' submersible. He holds the world record for longest distance traveled by a diver (52 miles in 9.5 hours).

Cassell grew up in California and worked as an underwater welder as a teenager. He began diving in 1977. Cassell spent over a decade filming or photographing Humboldt squid. It has been claimed that in November 2006 Cassell became the first person to film a giant squid in its natural environment, leading an expedition that filmed an Architeuthis dux with an estimated length of 40 feet in predatory behavior. The footage aired on a History Channel program, MonsterQuest: Giant Squid Found. Cassell subsequently distanced himself from this documentary, claiming that it contained multiple factual, scientific, and ethical errors.

Cassell is a former U.S. Army combat medic (68W), and served as an AeroScout Observer (93B) in the California Army National Guard from 1985 to 2000. He served as a combat diver for fifteen years. He has served as a sniper, an anti-piracy consultant and a Counterterrorism Combat Dive Instructor for Special Ops personnel. Cassell has twenty years of experience with closed circuit rebreathers. He is also an experienced cave diver. Cassell is a featured contributor to California Diver Magazine.

Cassell is the founder and head of Sea Wolves Unlimited and the Undersea Voyager Project (UVP). Sea Wolves uses Special Ops techniques on "rECOn missions" to identify the killers of marine endangered species. UVP is a non-profit organization dedicated to ocean health. UVP's first mission was conducted in Lake Tahoe and included 58 submersible dives and 33 scuba dives.

On September 17, 2011, Cassell attempted to set a new world record for longest distance traveled by a diver. Cassell planned to swim a distance of 30 miles, from Santa Catalina Island to San Pedro Harbor, during one continuous scuba dive while conducting experiments related to the decline in shark populations. He suffered a near-fatal equipment failure, forcing him to surface and give up the record attempt, but completed the dive after correcting the technical problems. No sharks were found during the dive.
