= Twenty Thousand Leagues Under the Seas =

1870 science fiction novel by Jules Verne

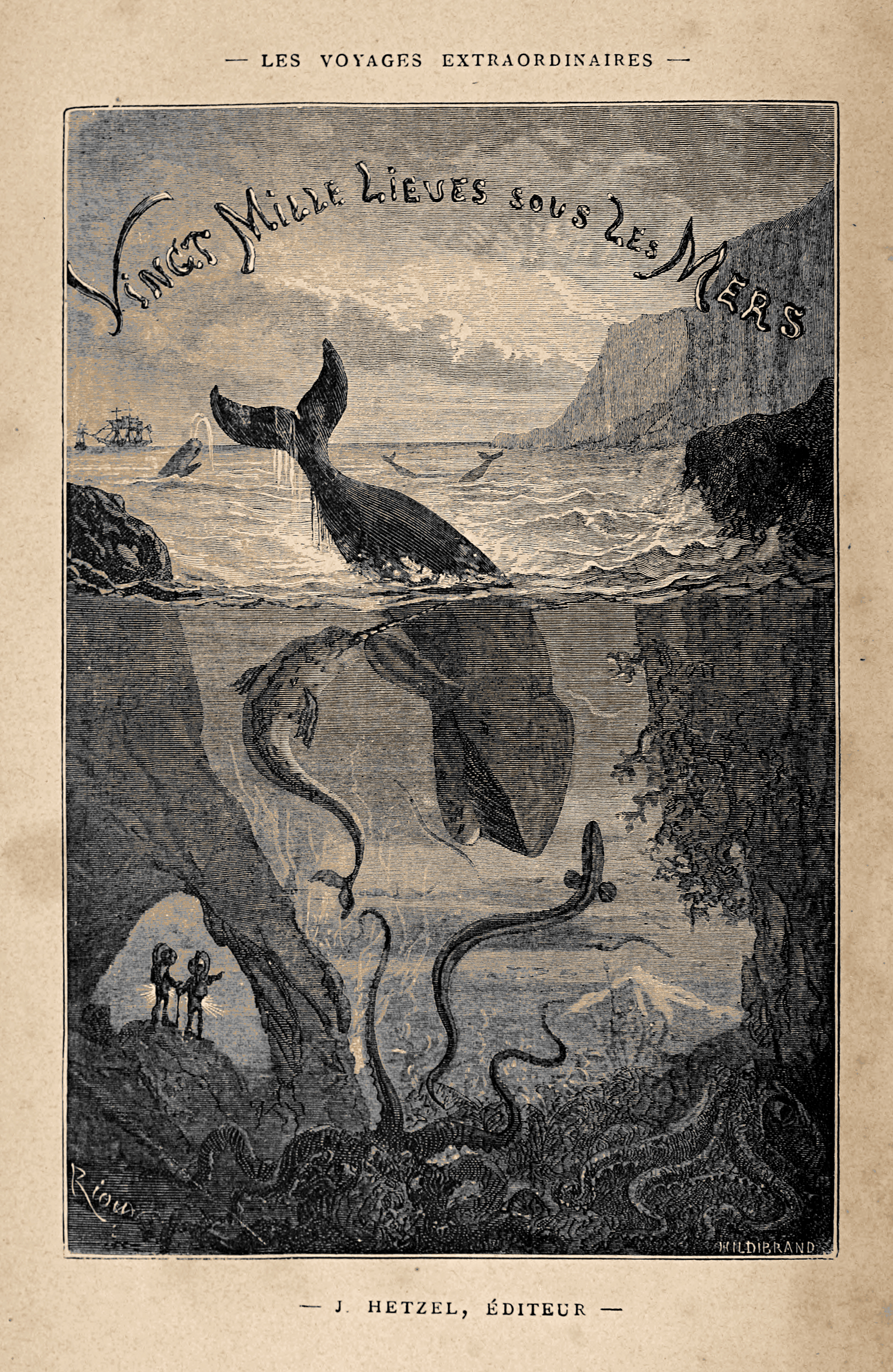
- Frontispiece of 1871 edition
- Author: Jules Verne
- Original title: Vingt Mille Lieues sous les mers
- Illustrator: Alphonse de Neuville and Édouard Riou
- Language: French
- Series: Voyages extraordinaires Captain Nemo #1
- Genre: Adventure, Science fiction
- Publisher: Pierre-Jules Hetzel
- Publication date: March 1869 to June 1870 (as serial); 1870 (book form)
- Publication place: France
- English publication date: 1872
- Preceded by: In Search of the Castaways
- Followed by: Around the Moon

Twenty Thousand Leagues Under the Seas (French: Vingt Mille Lieues sous les mers) is a science fiction adventure novel by the French writer Jules Verne. It was originally serialised from March 1869 to June 1870 in Pierre-Jules Hetzel's French fortnightly periodical, the Magasin d'éducation et de récréation. A deluxe octavo edition, published by Hetzel in November 1871, included 111 illustrations by Alphonse de Neuville and Édouard Riou.

The book was widely acclaimed on its release, and remains so; it is regarded as one of the premier adventure novels and one of Verne's greatest works, along with Around the World in Eighty Days, Journey to the Center of the Earth and Michael Strogoff. Its depiction of Captain Nemo's submarine, Nautilus, is regarded as ahead of its time, as it accurately describes many features of modern submarines, which in the 1860s were comparatively primitive vessels. Verne was inspired by a model of the French submarine Plongeur, which he saw at the Exposition Universelle in 1867.

== Title ==
The title refers to the distance travelled under the various seas, not the depth: 20,000 metric leagues (80,000 km, over 40,000 nautical miles) amounts to nearly twice the circumference of Earth.

== Principal characters ==
- Professor Pierre Aronnax, a French natural scientist who also serves as the narrator
- Conseil, Aronnax's Flemish servant who is highly devoted to him and knowledgeable in biological classification
- Ned Land, a Canadian harpooner, described as having "no equal in his dangerous trade"
- Captain Nemo, the designer and captain of Nautilus

== Plot ==
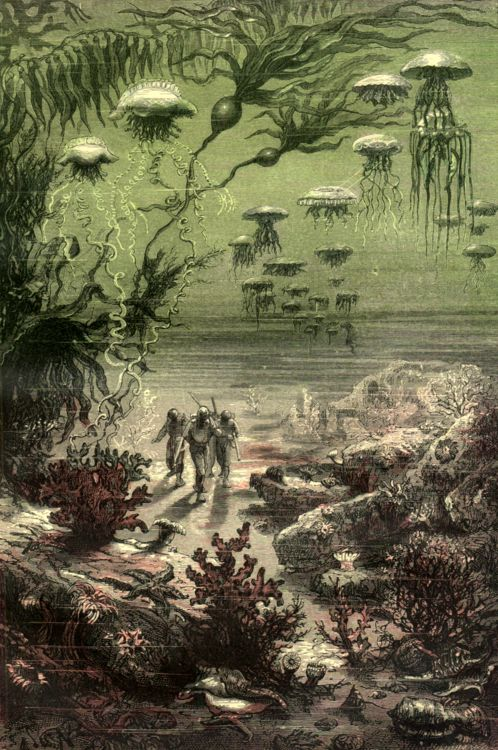
Illustration by Alphonse de Neuville and Édouard Riou

In 1866, ships of various nationalities sight a mysterious sea monster which is speculated to be a gigantic narwhal. The United States government assembles an expedition in New York City to find and destroy the monster. Professor Pierre Aronnax, a French marine biologist and the story's narrator, is in town at the time and receives a last-minute invitation from the government to join the expedition. A Canadian whaler and master harpooner named Ned Land and Aronnax's faithful manservant, Conseil, are also among the participants.

The expedition leaves Brooklyn aboard the US Navy frigate Abraham Lincoln, captained by Admiral Farragut. The ship travels south around Cape Horn into the Pacific Ocean. After a five-month search ending off Japan, it locates and attacks the monster, which damages the ship's rudder. Aronnax and Land are hurled into the sea, and Conseil jumps in after them. They survive by climbing onto the "monster", which, much to their surprise, is in fact a futuristic submarine. They wait on the deck until morning, when they are caught and introduced to its mysterious constructor and commander, Captain Nemo.

The rest of the novel describes the protagonists' adventures aboard the submarine Nautilus, which was built in secrecy and now roams the seas, beyond the reach of governments. In self-imposed exile, Captain Nemo seems to have a dual motivation—a quest for scientific knowledge and a desire to escape terrestrial civilisation. Nemo explains that his submarine is electrically powered and can conduct advanced marine research; he also tells his new passengers that his secret existence means he cannot let them leave; they must remain on board permanently.

They visit many oceanic regions, some real and others fictional. The travellers view coral formations, sunken vessels from the Battle of Vigo Bay, the Antarctic ice barrier, the transatlantic telegraph cable and the legendary underwater realm of Atlantis. They travel to the South Pole and are trapped in an upheaval of an iceberg on the way back, caught in a narrow gallery of ice from which they are forced to dig themselves out. The passengers also put on diving suits, hunt sharks and other marine fauna with air guns in the underwater forests of Crespo Island and attend an undersea funeral for a crewman who died during a mysterious collision experienced by Nautilus. When the submarine returns to the Atlantic Ocean, a school of giant squid ("devilfish") attack it and kill another crewman.

The later pages suggest Captain Nemo went into undersea exile after his homeland was conquered and his family were slaughtered by a powerful imperialist nation. Following the episode of the devilfish, Nemo largely avoids Aronnax, who begins to side with Ned Land in planning to flee the submarine. Ultimately, Nautilus is attacked by a warship from the mysterious nation that has caused Nemo such suffering. Carrying out his quest for revenge, Nemo—whom Aronnax dubs an "archangel of hatred"—rams the ship below its waterline and sends it to the bottom, much to the professor's horror. Afterwards, Nemo kneels before a portrait of his deceased wife and children, then sinks into a deep depression.

Circumstances aboard the submarine change drastically: watches are no longer kept, and the vessel wanders about aimlessly, rarely surfacing. A frustrated Ned becomes so reclusive that Conseil fears for his wellbeing. One morning, he announces that they are in sight of land and have a chance to escape. Aronnax is more than ready to leave Captain Nemo, who now horrifies him, yet he is still drawn to the man. Fearing that Nemo's very presence could weaken his resolve, he avoids contact with him. Before their departure, the professor eavesdrops on Nemo and overhears him calling out in anguish, "O almighty God! Enough! Enough!" Aronnax immediately joins his companions as they carry out their escape plans, but as they board the submarine's skiff they realise Nautilus has seemingly blundered into the ocean's deadliest whirlpool, the Moskstraumen (more commonly known as the Maelstrom). They escape and find refuge on an island off the coast of Norway. The submarine's ultimate fate remained unknown until the events of The Mysterious Island (1875).

== Themes and subtext ==
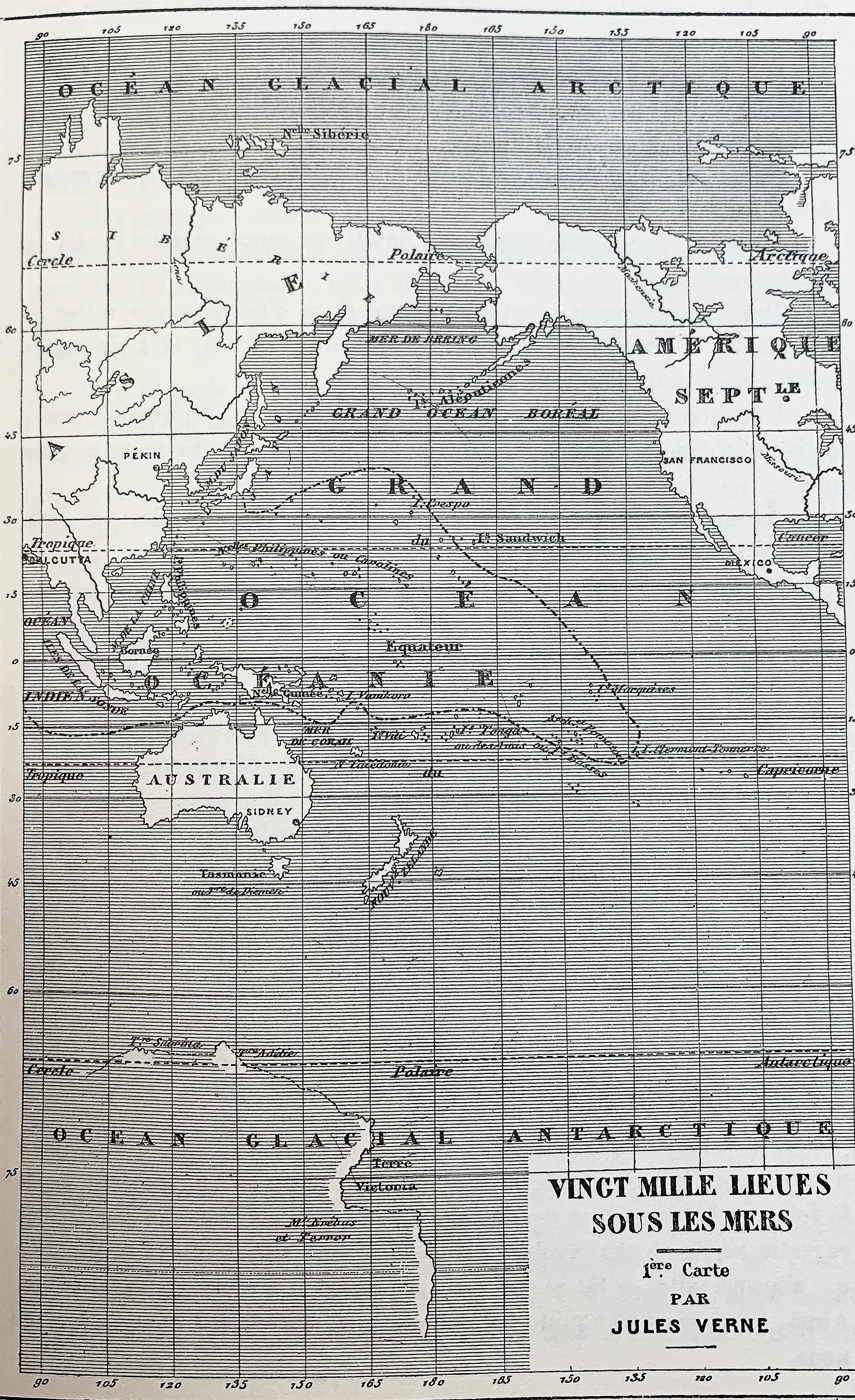
Nautilus's route through the Pacific

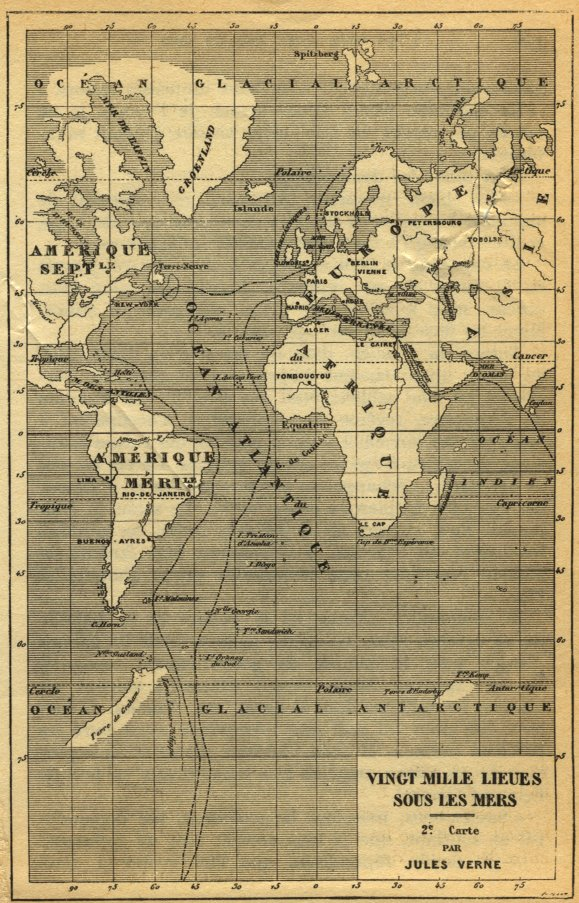
Nautilus's route through the Atlantic

Other symbols and themes pique modern critics. Margaret Drabble argues that Verne's masterwork also anticipated the ecology movement and influenced French avant-garde imagery. As for additional motifs, Captain Nemo repeatedly champions the world's persecuted and downtrodden. While in Mediterranean waters, he provides financial support to rebels resisting rule by the Ottoman Empire during the Cretan Revolt of 1866–1869, proving to Aronnax that he had not severed all relations with terrestrial mankind. In another episode, Nemo rescues an Indian pearl-hunter from a shark attack, then gives him a pouch full of pearls, more than the man could have gathered after years of his hazardous work. When asked why he would help a "representative of that race from which he'd fled under the seas", Nemo responds that the diver, as an "East Indian", "lives in the land of the oppressed".

Indeed, the novel has an under-the-counter political vision, hinted at in the character and background of Captain Nemo himself. In the book's final form, Nemo says to professor Aronnax, "That Indian, sir, is an inhabitant of an oppressed country; and I am still, and shall be, to my last breath, one of them!"

Even so, a trace remains of the novel's initial concept, a detail that may have eluded Hetzel: its allusion to an unsuccessful rebellion under a Polish hero, Tadeusz Kościuszko, leader of the uprising against Russian and Prussian control in 1794.

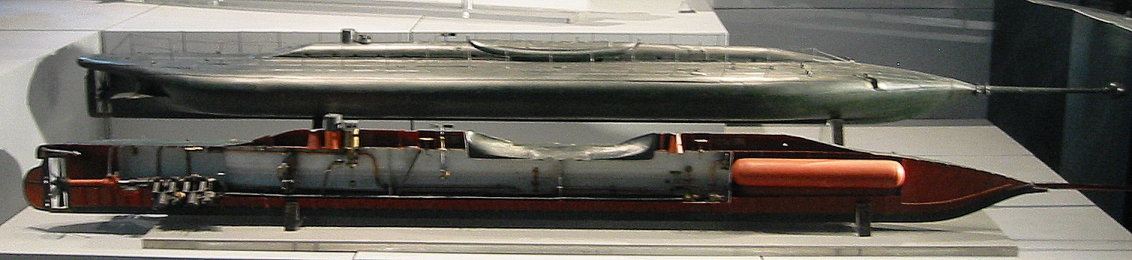
Model of the 1863 French Navy submarine Plongeur at the Musée de la Marine, Paris

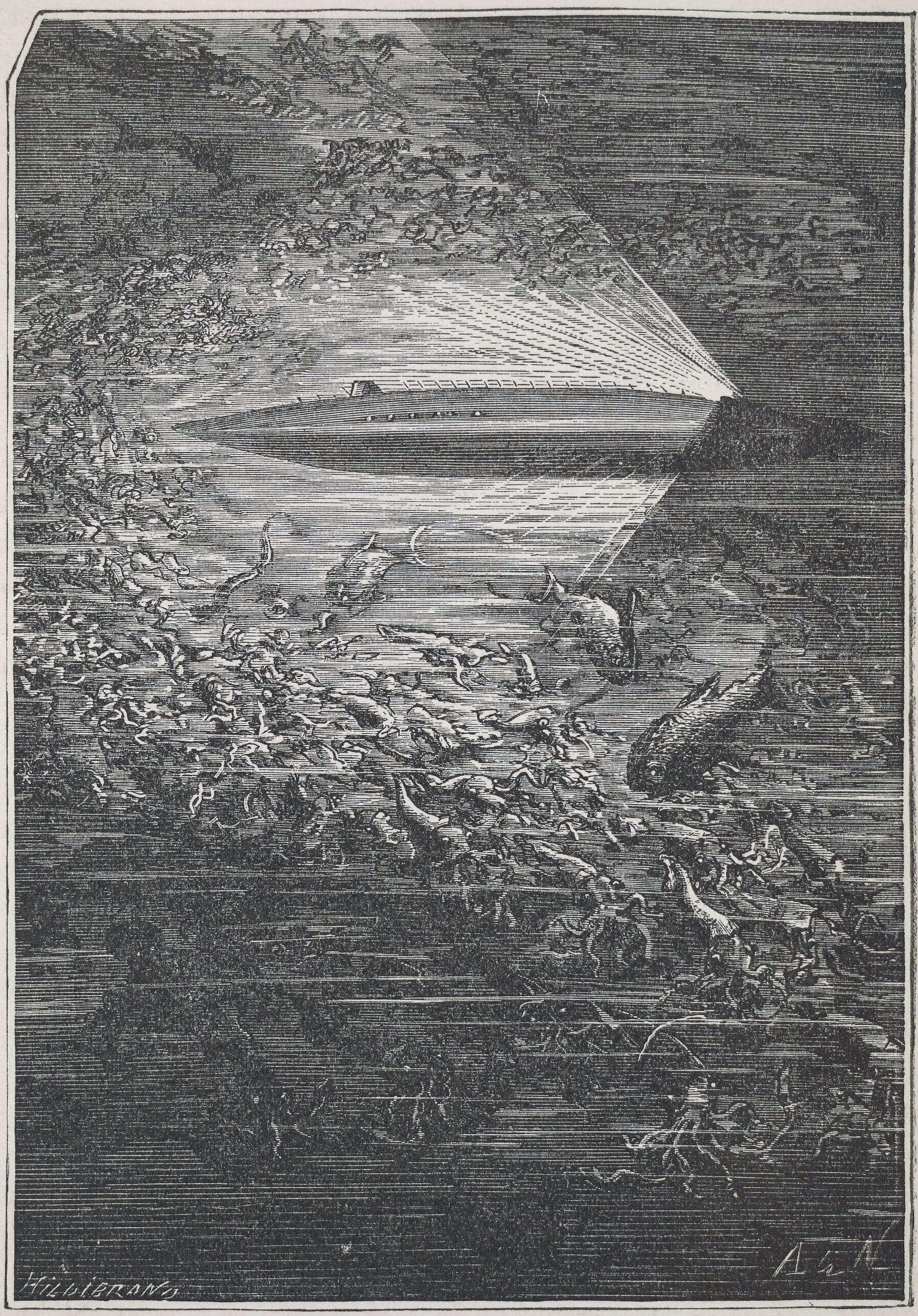
Illustration of the Nautilus by Alphonse de Neuville and Édouard Riou

Verne took the name "Nautilus" from one of the earliest successful submarines, built in 1800 by Robert Fulton, who also invented the first commercially successful steamboat. Fulton named his submarine after a marine mollusk, the chambered nautilus. As noted above, Verne also studied a model of the newly developed French Navy submarine Plongeur at the 1867 Exposition Universelle, which guided him in his development of the novel's Nautilus.

The diving gear used by passengers on the Nautilus is presented as a combination of two existing systems: 1) the surface-supplied hardhat suit, which was fed oxygen from the shore through tubes; 2) a later, self-contained apparatus designed by Benoit Rouquayrol and Auguste Denayrouze in 1865. Their invention featured tanks fastened to the back, which supplied air to a facial mask via the first-known demand regulator.

== English translations ==
Twenty Thousand Leagues Under the Seas was first translated into English in 1872 by Reverend Lewis Page Mercier. Mercier cut nearly a quarter of Verne's French text and committed hundreds of translation errors, sometimes drastically distorting Verne's original (including uniformly mistranslating the French scaphandre — properly "diving suit" — as "cork-jacket", following a long-obsolete usage as "a type of lifejacket"). Some of these distortions may have been perpetrated for political reasons, such as Mercier's omitting the portraits of freedom fighters on the wall of Nemo's stateroom, a collection originally including Daniel O'Connell amongst other international figures.

In 1955, an abridged version for children was published by "Collins Seagull Library"

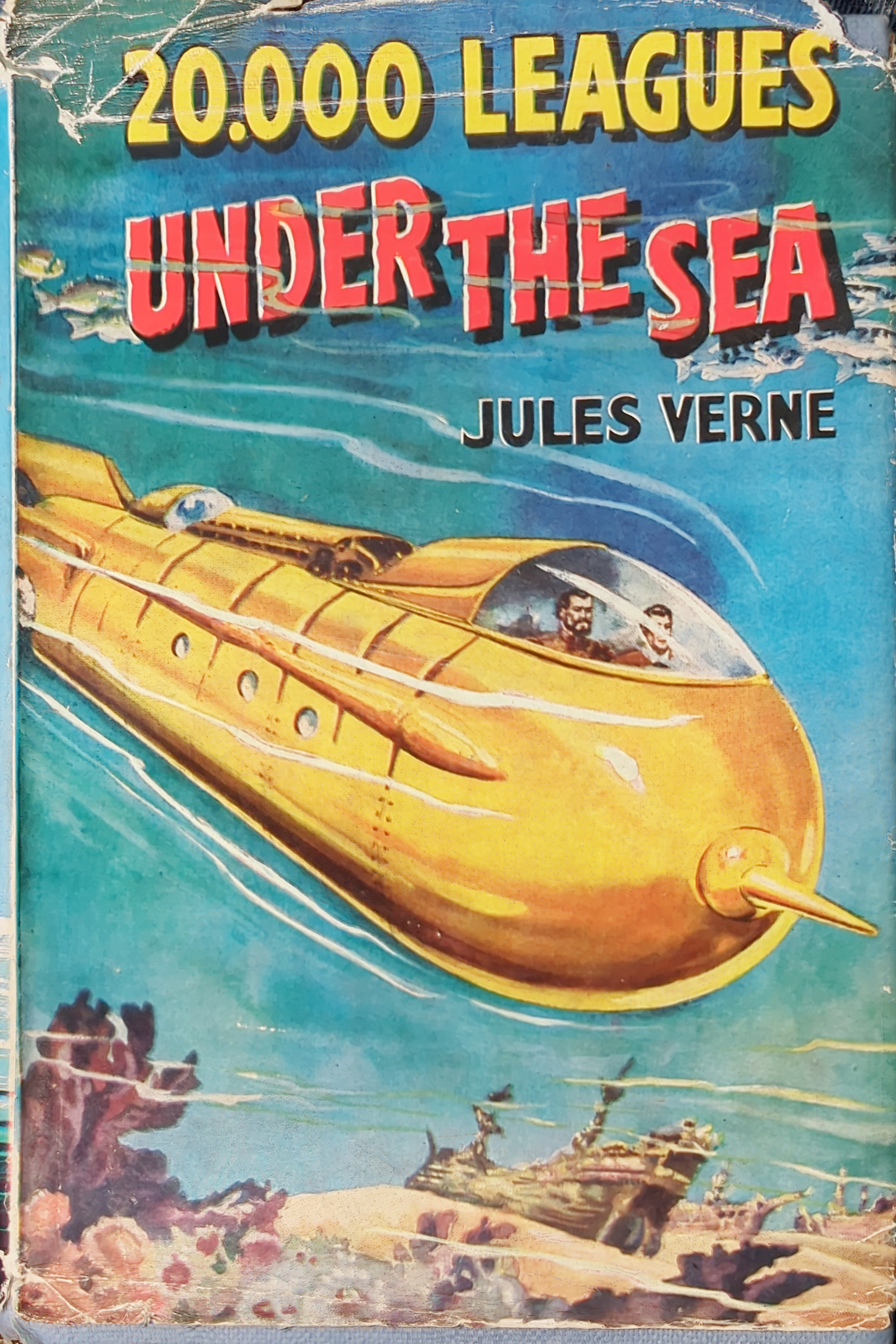
1956 cover of "Collins Seagull Library" abridged edition of 20,000 Leagues Under the Sea

In 1962, Anthony Bonner published a translation with Bantam Classics. This edition included an introduction by the American writer Ray Bradbury, comparing Captain Nemo to Captain Ahab of Moby-Dick.

A significant modern revision of Mercier's translation appeared in 1966, prepared by Walter James Miller and published by Washington Square Press. Miller addressed many of Mercier's errors in the volume's preface and restored a number of his deletions in the text. In 1976, Miller published "The Annotated Jules Verne, Twenty Thousand Leagues under the Sea" at the suggestion of the Thomas Y. Crowel Company editorial staff. The cover declared it "the only completely restored and annotated edition". In 1993, Miller collaborated with his fellow Vernian Frederick Paul Walter to produce "The Completely Restored and Annotated Edition", published in 1993 by the Naval Institute Press. Its text took advantage of Walter's unpublished translation, which Project Gutenberg later made available online.

In 1998 William Butcher issued a new, annotated translation with the title Twenty Thousand Leagues under the Seas, published by Oxford University Press (ISBN 978-0-19-953927-7). In 2010, Frederick Paul Walter issued a fully revised, newly researched translation, 20,000 Leagues Under the Seas: A World Tour Underwater. Complete with an extensive introduction, textual notes, and bibliography, it appeared in an omnibus of five of Walter's Verne translations titled Amazing Journeys: Five Visionary Classics and published by State University of New York Press (ISBN 978-1-4384-3238-0). In 2017, David Coward issued a new translation published by Penguin Classics (ISBN 9780141394930) with the title Twenty Thousand Leagues Under the Sea.

== Reception ==
The science fiction writer Theodore L. Thomas criticized the novel in 1961, claiming that "there is not a single bit of valid speculation" in the book and that "none of its predictions has come true". He described its depictions of Nemo's diving gear, underwater activities, and the Nautilus as "pretty bad, behind the times even for 1869 ... In none of these technical situations did Verne take advantage of knowledge readily available to him at the time." The notes to the 1993 translation say that the errors Thomas notes were in Mercier's translation, not the original. Despite his criticisms, Thomas conceded: "Put them all together with the magic of Verne's story-telling ability, and something flames up. A story emerges that sweeps incredulity before it".

In 2023 Malaurie Guillaume presented Nemo as the first eco-terrorist or the first figure of ecological radicalism.

== See also ==
- List of underwater science fiction works
- French corvette Alecton – Ship which encountered a giant squid
