= Edith Widder =

American oceanographer

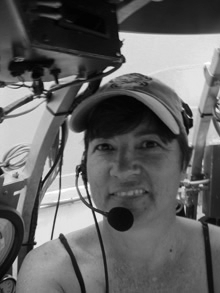
- Widder in the Johnson Sea Link submersible, July 2009
- Born: 1951 (age 74–75); Arlington, Massachusetts, United States
- Education: Tufts University (B.S. 1973); University of California, Santa Barbara (M.S. 1977, Ph.D. 1982)
- Known for: Bioluminescence research
- Spouse: David Smith
- Awards: MacArthur Fellow (2006)
- Scientific career
- Fields: Oceanography and marine biology

Edith Anne "Edie" Widder Smith (born 1951) is an American oceanographer, marine biologist, author, and the co-founder, CEO and Senior Scientist at the Ocean Research & Conservation Association.

== Early life and education ==
Widder was born in Arlington, Massachusetts to Dr. David Widder, a Harvard University mathematics professor, and Dr. Vera Widder, a mathematician turned stay at home mother. She had an older brother, David Charles Widder.

She graduated from Tufts University magna cum laude with a B.S. in Biology, from University of California, Santa Barbara with an M.S. in Biochemistry, and from University of California, Santa Barbara with a PhD in Neurobiology, in 1982.

== Career ==
Widder was a senior scientist and director of the Bioluminescence Department at the Harbor Branch Oceanographic Institution from 1989 to 2005. Certified as a Scientific Research Pilot for Atmospheric Diving Systems in 1984, she holds certifications that qualify her to dive the deep diving suit WASP as well as the single-person untethered submersibles DEEP ROVER and DEEP WORKER. She has made over 250 dives in the JOHNSON SEA LINK submersibles. Her research involving submersibles has been featured in BBC, PBS, Discovery Channel, and National Geographic television productions.

A specialist in bioluminescence, she has been a leader in helping to design and invent new instrumentation and techniques that enable scientists to see the ocean in new ways. These include HIDEX, a bathyphotometer, which is the U.S. Navy standard for measuring bioluminescence in the ocean, and a remotely operated camera system, known as Eye in the Sea (EITS), an unobtrusive deep-sea observatory.

In 2005, Widder co-founded the Ocean Research & Conservation Association (ORCA), a non-profit organization dedicated to protecting aquatic ecosystems and the species they sustain by developing innovative technologies and science-based conservation action. While translating complex scientific issues into engineerable solutions, Widder is fostering a greater understanding of ocean life as a means to better, more informed ocean stewardship. In September 2006 she was awarded a prestigious MacArthur Fellowship from the John D. and Catherine T. MacArthur Foundation and in 2010 she participated in the TED Mission Blue Voyage in the Galapagos.

In 2012, a team of scientists comprising Edith Widder, zoologist Tsunemi Kubodera and marine biologist Steve O'Shea successfully filmed a live giant squid (Architeuthis dux) in its natural habitat aboard Oceanx's MV Alucia.

In 2019, Edith Widder and Nathan J. Robinson filmed the first-ever footage of a live giant squid recorded in US waters. It was filmed 100 miles southeast of New Orleans, Louisiana in the Gulf of Mexico. This expedition was aboard the R/V Point Sur of the University of Southern Mississippi.

The 2025 documentary A Life Illuminated is about Widder.

== Personal life ==
Widder is married to David Smith, a computer engineer.

== Awards and honors ==
- 2006 MacArthur Fellows Program
- 2015 Roy Chapman Andrews Society Distinguished Explorer Award
- 2018 Explorers Club Citation of Merit
- 2019 Eleanor Fletcher Lifetime Achievement Award
- 2020 Captain Don Walsh Award for Ocean Exploration established by the Marine Technology Society and the Society of Underwater Technology

== Publications ==
Selected publications include:

- Widder, Edith A.; Latz, Michael I.; Case, James F. (1983). "Marine bioluminescence spectra measured with an optical multichannel detection system". The Biological Bulletin. 165 (3): 791–810. doi:10.2307/1541479. ISSN 0006-3185. JSTOR 1541479. PMID 29324013.
- Widder, E. A.; Latz, M. I.; Herring, P. J.; Case, J. F. (1984). "Far Red Bioluminescence from Two Deep-Sea Fishes". Science. 225 (4661): 512–514. Bibcode:1984Sci...225..512W. doi:10.1126/science.225.4661.512. PMID 17750854. S2CID 31510972.
- Widder, E. A.; Johnsen, S.; Bernstein, S. A.; Case, J. F.; Neilson, D. J. (1999). "Thin layers of bioluminescent copepods found at density discontinuities in the water column". Marine Biology. 134 (3): 429–437. Bibcode:1999MarBi.134..429W. doi:10.1007/s002270050559. S2CID 18255901.
- Johnsen, S. and E.A. Widder. (1999) The physical basis of transparency in biological tissue: Ultrastructure and the minimization of light scattering. J. Theor. Biol. 199: 181–198
- Widder, E. A. (2010). "Bioluminescence in the Ocean: Origins of Biological, Chemical, and Ecological Diversity". Science. 328 (5979): 704–708. Bibcode:2010Sci...328..704W. doi:10.1126/science.1174269. PMID 20448176. S2CID 2375135.
- Robinson, N.; Johnsen, S.; Brooks, A.; Frey, L.; Judkins, H.; Vecchione, M.; Widder, E. (2021). "Studying the swift, smart, and shy: Unobtrusive camera-platforms for observing large deep-sea squid."

=== Books ===
- The Bioluminescence Coloring Book
- Below the Edge of Darkness: A Memoir of Exploring Light and Life in the Deep Sea
