= Giant squid =

- Specimen of a giant squid that washed ashore in Trondheim, Norway, being measured in 1954

Conservation status
- Least Concern (IUCN 3.1)

Scientific classification
- Kingdom: Animalia
- Phylum: Mollusca
- Class: Cephalopoda
- Order: Oegopsida
- Superfamily: Architeuthoidea
- Family: Architeuthidae; Pfeffer, 1900
- Genus: Architeuthis; Steenstrup in Harting, 1860
- Species: A. dux

Binomial name
- Architeuthis dux Steenstrup, 1857
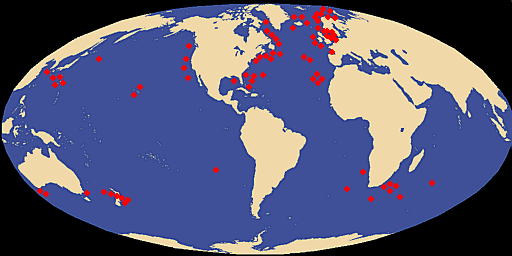
- Worldwide giant squid distribution based on recovered specimens

Synonyms
- List: Architeuthus Steenstrup, 1857; Dinoteuthis More, 1875; Dubioteuthis Joubin, 1900; Megaloteuthis Kent, 1874; Megateuthis Hilgendorf in Carus, 1880; Megateuthus Hilgendorf, 1880; Mouchezis Vélain, 1877; Plectoteuthis Owen, 1881; Steenstrupia Kirk, 1882

Deep-ocean dwelling squid in the family Architeuthidae

The giant squid (Architeuthis dux) is a species of deep-ocean dwelling squid in the family Architeuthidae. It can grow to a tremendous size, offering an example of abyssal gigantism; recent estimates put the maximum body size at around 5 m (16 ft) for females, with males slightly shorter, from the posterior fins to the tip of its long arms. This makes it longer than the colossal squid at an estimated 4.2 m (14 ft), but substantially lighter, as it is less robust and its arms make up much of the length. The mantle of the giant squid is about 2 m (6 ft 7 in) long (longer for females, shorter for males), and the feeding tentacles of the giant squid, concealed in life, are 10 m (33 ft). Claims of specimens measuring 20 m (66 ft) or more have not been scientifically documented.

The number of different giant squid species has been debated, but genetic research suggests that only one species exists. In 2004, a Japanese research team obtained the first images of a living specimen in its habitat.

== Taxonomy ==
The closest relatives of the giant squid are thought to be the four obscure species of "neosquid" in the family Neoteuthidae, each of which belongs to its own monotypic genus, as with the giant squid. Together, both families comprise the superfamily Architeuthoidea.

== Range and habitat ==
The giant squid is widespread, occurring in all of the world's oceans. It is usually found near continental and island slopes from the North Atlantic Ocean, especially Newfoundland, Norway, the northern British Isles, Spain, and the oceanic islands of the Azores and Madeira, to the South Atlantic around southern Africa, the North Pacific around Japan, and the southwestern Pacific around New Zealand and Australia. Specimens are rare in tropical and polar latitudes.

The vertical distribution of giant squid is incompletely known, but data from trawled specimens and sperm whale diving behavior suggest it spans a large range of depths, possibly 300–1,000 m (980–3,280 ft).

== Morphology and anatomy ==
Like all squid, a giant squid has a mantle (torso), eight arms, and two longer tentacles (the longest known tentacles of any cephalopod). The arms and tentacles account for much of the squid's great length, making it much lighter than its chief predator, the sperm whale. Scientifically documented specimens have masses of hundreds, rather than thousands, of kilograms.

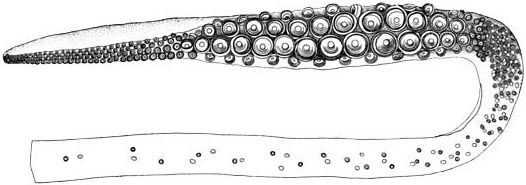
Tentacular club of Architeuthis

The inside surfaces of the arms and tentacles are lined with hundreds of subspherical suction cups, 2 to 5 cm (3/4 to 2 in) in diameter, each mounted on a stalk. The circumference of these suckers is lined with sharp, finely serrated rings of chitin. The perforation of these teeth and the suction of the cups serve to attach the squid to its prey. It is common to find circular scars from the suckers on or close to the head of sperm whales that have attacked giant squid.

Each tentacular club is divided into three regions—the carpus ("wrist"), manus ("hand") and dactylus ("finger"). The carpus has a dense cluster of cups, in six or seven irregular, transverse rows. The manus is broader closer to the end of the club, and has enlarged suckers in two medial rows. The dactylus is the tip. The bases of all the arms and tentacles are arranged in a circle surrounding the animal's single, parrot-like beak, as in other cephalopods.

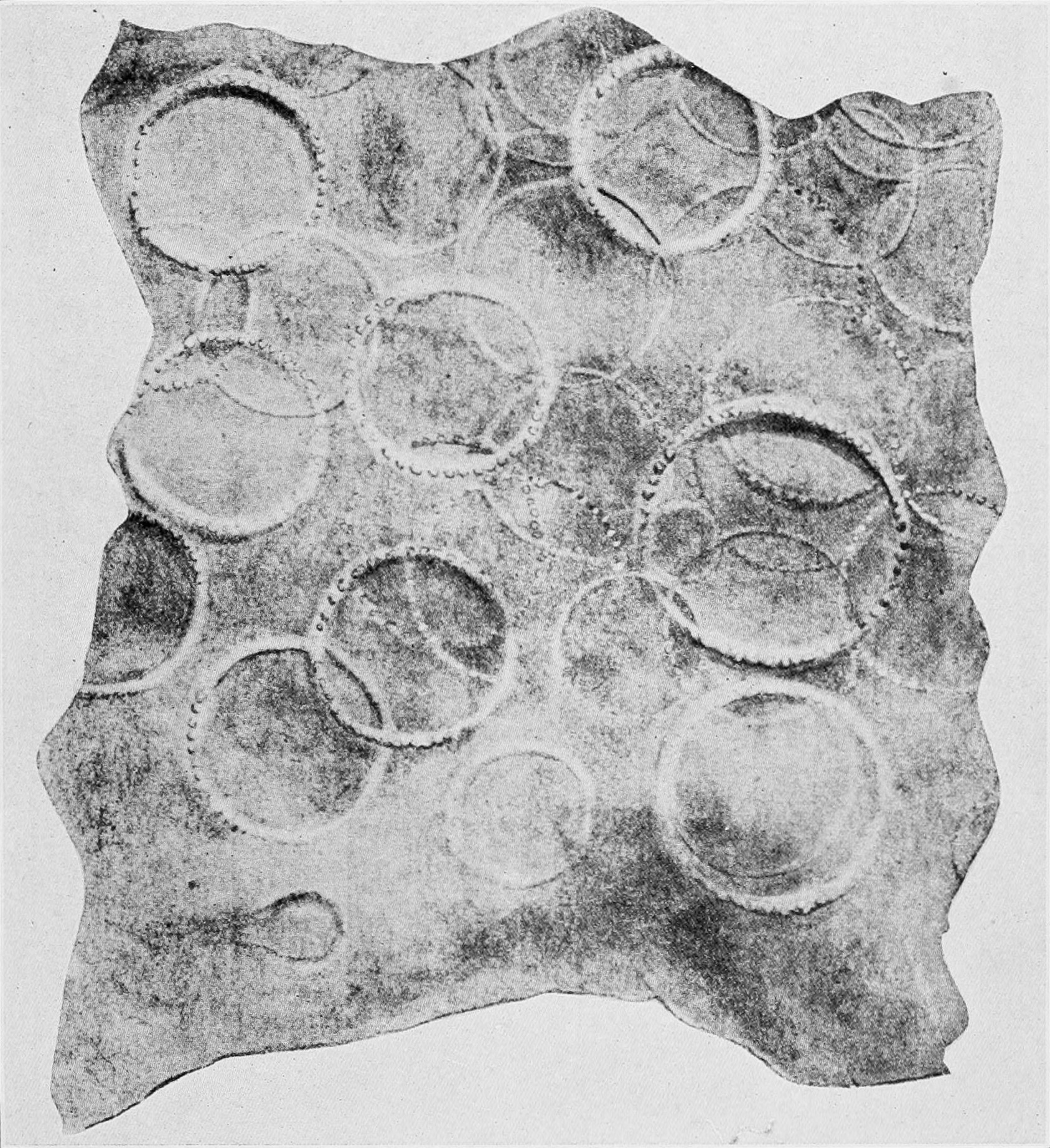
A portion of sperm whale skin with giant squid sucker scars

Giant squid have small fins at the rear of their mantles used for locomotion. Like other cephalopods, they move through jet propulsion—by pulling water into the mantle cavity, and pushing it through the siphon, in gentle, rhythmic pulses. They can also move quickly by expanding the cavity to fill it with water, then contracting muscles to jet water through the siphon. Giant squid breathe using two large gills inside the mantle cavity. The circulatory system is closed, which is a distinct characteristic of cephalopods. Like other squid, they contain dark ink.

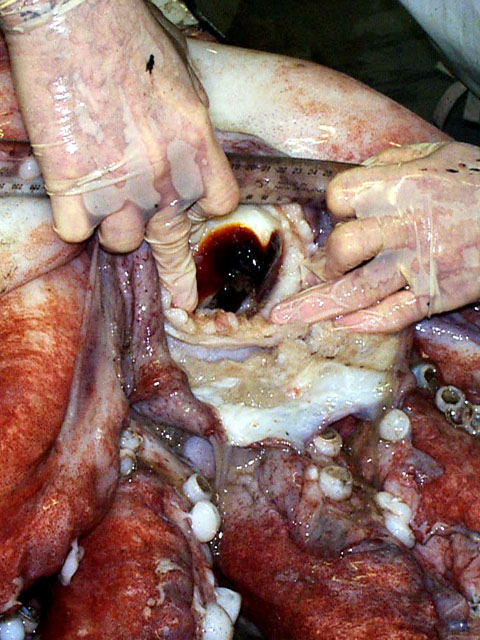
The beak of a giant squid, surrounded by the buccal mass

The giant squid has a sophisticated nervous system and complex brain, attracting great interest from scientists. It also has the largest eyes of any living creature except perhaps the colossal squid—up to at least 27 cm (11 in) in diameter, with a 9 cm (3 1/2 in) pupil (only the extinct ichthyosaurs are known to have had larger eyes). Large eyes can better detect light (including bioluminescent light), which is scarce in deep water. The giant squid probably cannot see color, but it can probably discern small differences in tone, which is important in the low-light conditions of the deep ocean.

Giant squid and some other large squid species maintain neutral buoyancy in seawater through an ammonium chloride solution which is found throughout their bodies and is lighter than seawater. This differs from the method of flotation used by most fish, which involves a gas-filled swim bladder. The solution tastes somewhat like salty liquorice/salmiak and makes giant squid unattractive for general human consumption.

Like all cephalopods, giant squid use organs called statocysts to sense their orientation and motion in water. The age of a giant squid can be determined by "growth rings" in the statocyst's statolith, similar to determining the age of a tree by counting its rings. Much of what is known about giant squid age is based on estimates of the growth rings and from undigested beaks found in the stomachs of sperm whales.

== Size ==
The giant squid is the second-largest mollusc and one of the largest of all extant invertebrates. It is exceeded only by the colossal squid, Mesonychoteuthis hamiltoni, which may have a mantle nearly twice as long. Several extinct cephalopods, such as the Cretaceous coleoids Yezoteuthis and Haboroteuthis, and the Ordovician nautiloid Endoceras may have grown even larger. Although the Cretaceous Tusoteuthis, with its 2 m (6 1/2 ft) long mantle, was once considered to grow to a size close to that of the giant squid (over 10 m or 33 ft including arms), this genus is likely doubtful. The largest specimen probably belonged to the genus Enchoteuthis, estimated to have short arms, with a total length of only 3 m (9.8 ft).

Giant squid size, particularly total length, has often been exaggerated. Reports of specimens reaching and even exceeding 20 m (66 ft) are widespread, but no specimens approaching this size have been scientifically documented. According to giant squid expert Steve O'Shea, such lengths were likely achieved by greatly stretching the two tentacles like elastic bands.

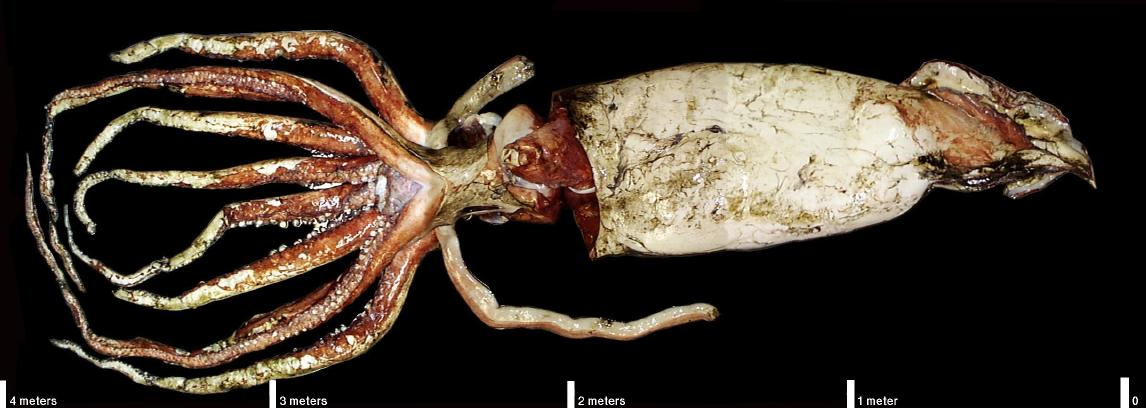
A giant squid specimen measuring over 4 m (13 ft) without its two long feeding tentacles

Based on the examination of 130 specimens and of beaks found inside sperm whales, giant squids' mantles are not known to exceed 2.25 m (7 ft 4.6 in). Including the head and arms, but excluding the tentacles, the length very rarely exceeds 5 m (16 ft). Maximum total length, when measured relaxed post mortem, is estimated at 12 m (39 ft) or 13 m (43 ft) for females and 10 m (33 ft) for males from the posterior fins to the tip of the two long tentacles.

Giant squid exhibit sexual dimorphism. Maximum weight is estimated at 275 kg (606 lb) for females and 150 kg (330 lb) for males.

== Reproductive cycle ==
Little is known about the reproductive cycle of giant squid. They are thought to reach sexual maturity at about three years old; males reach sexual maturity at a smaller size than females. Females produce large quantities of eggs, sometimes more than 5 kg (11 lb), that average 0.5 to 1.4 mm (0.020 to 0.055 in) long and 0.3 to 0.7 mm (0.012 to 0.028 in) wide. Females have a single median ovary in the rear end of the mantle cavity and paired, convoluted oviducts, where mature eggs pass, exiting through the oviducal glands, then through the nidamental glands. As in other squid, these glands produce a gelatinous material used to keep the eggs together once they are laid.

In males, as with most other cephalopods, the single, posterior testis produces sperm that move into a complex system of glands that manufacture the spermatophores. These are stored in the elongate sac, or Needham's sac, that terminates in the penis from which they are expelled during mating. The penis is prehensile, over 90 cm (35 in) long, and extends from inside the mantle. The two ventral arms on a male giant squid are hectocotylized, which means they are specialized to facilitate the fertilization of the female's eggs.

How the sperm is transferred to the egg mass is much debated, as giant squid lack the hectocotylus used for reproduction in many other cephalopods. It may be transferred in sacs of spermatophores, called spermatangia, which the male injects into the female's arms. This is suggested by a female specimen recently found in Tasmania, having a small subsidiary tendril attached to the base of each arm.

Post-larval juveniles have been discovered in surface waters off New Zealand, with plans to capture more and maintain them in an aquarium. Young giant squid specimens were found off the coast of southern Japan in 2013 and confirmed through genetic analysis.

Another juvenile, approximately 3.7 metres (12 ft) long, was encountered and filmed alive in the harbour in the Japanese city of Toyama on 24 December 2015; after being filmed and viewed by a large number of spectators, including a diver who entered the water to film the squid up close, it was guided out of the harbour into Toyama Bay by the diver.

== Genetics ==
Analysis of the mitochondrial DNA of giant squid individuals from all over the world has found that there is little variation between individuals across the globe (just 181 differing genetic base pairs out of 20,331). This suggests that there is only a single species of giant squid in the world. Squid larvae may be dispersed by ocean currents across vast distances.

== Ecology ==
=== Feeding ===
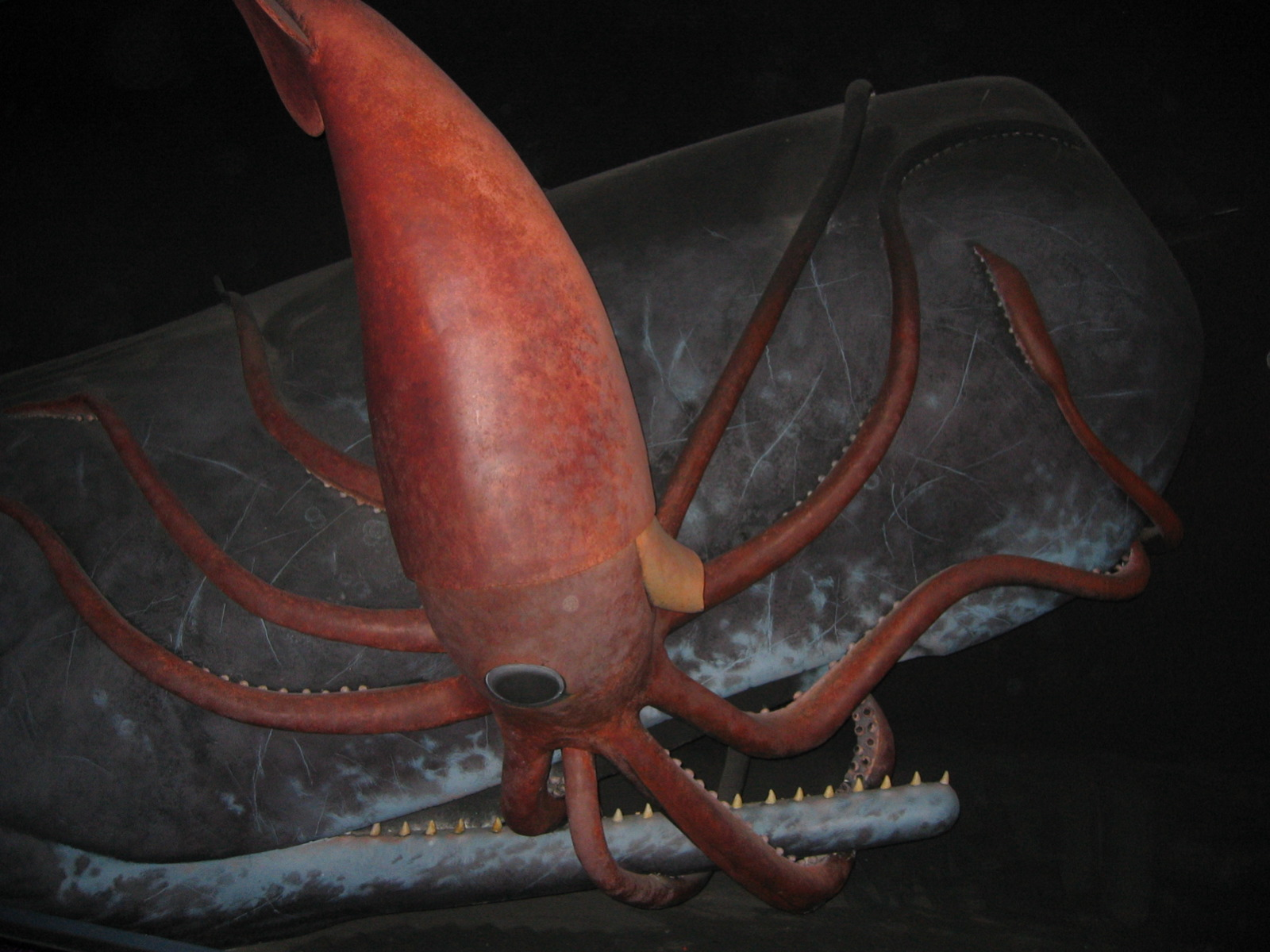
The dramatization of an underwater encounter between the sperm whale and giant squid, from a diorama in the Hall of Ocean Life at the American Museum of Natural History

Recent studies have shown giant squid feed on deep-sea fish, such as the orange roughy (Hoplostethus atlanticus), and other squid species. They catch prey using the two tentacles, gripping it with serrated sucker rings on the ends. Then they bring it toward the powerful beak, and shred it with the radula (tongue with small, file-like teeth) before it reaches the esophagus. They are believed to be solitary hunters, as only individual giant squid have been caught in fishing nets. Although the majority of giant squid caught by trawl in New Zealand waters have been associated with the local hoki (Macruronus novaezelandiae) fishery, hoki do not feature in the squid's diet. This suggests giant squid and hoki prey on the same animals.

=== Predators and potential cannibalism ===
The known predators of adult giant squid include sperm whales, pilot whales, southern sleeper sharks, and in some regions killer whales. Juveniles may fall prey to other large deep sea predators. Because sperm whales are skilled at locating giant squid, scientists have tried to observe them to study the squid. Giant squid have also been recently discovered to presumably steal food from each other; in mid-to-late October 2016, a giant squid measuring 9 m (30 ft) long, including its tentacles, washed ashore in Galicia, Spain. The squid had been photographed alive by a tourist named Javier Ondicol shortly before its death, and examination of its corpse by the Coordinators for the Study and Protection of Marine Species (CEPESMA) indicates that the squid was attacked and mortally wounded by another giant squid, losing parts of its fins, and receiving damage to its mantle, one of its gills, and losing an eye. The intact nature of the specimen indicates that the giant squid managed to escape its rival by slowly retreating to shallow water, where it died of its wounds. The incident is the second to be documented among Architeuthis recorded in Spain, with the other occurring in Villaviciosa. Evidence in the form of giant squid stomach contents containing beak fragments from other giant squid in Tasmania also supports the theory that the species is at least occasionally cannibalistic. Alternatively, such squid-on-squid attacks may be a result of competition for prey. These traits are seen in the Humboldt squid as well, indicating that cannibalism in large squid may be more common than originally thought.

== Population ==
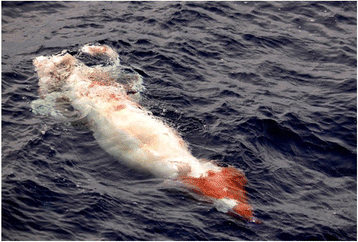
Giant squid observed from seismic vessel off Brazil, 30 May 2013

Scientists have been unable to determine the worldwide population of giant squid to any degree of accuracy. Estimates have been put together based on the number of giant squid beaks found in the stomachs of deceased sperm whales, a known predator of the giant squid, and the better-known population of sperm whales. Based on such observations, it has been estimated that sperm whales consume between 4.3 and 131 million giant squid annually, implying that the giant squid population is likewise well into the millions, but more precise estimates have been elusive.

== Species ==
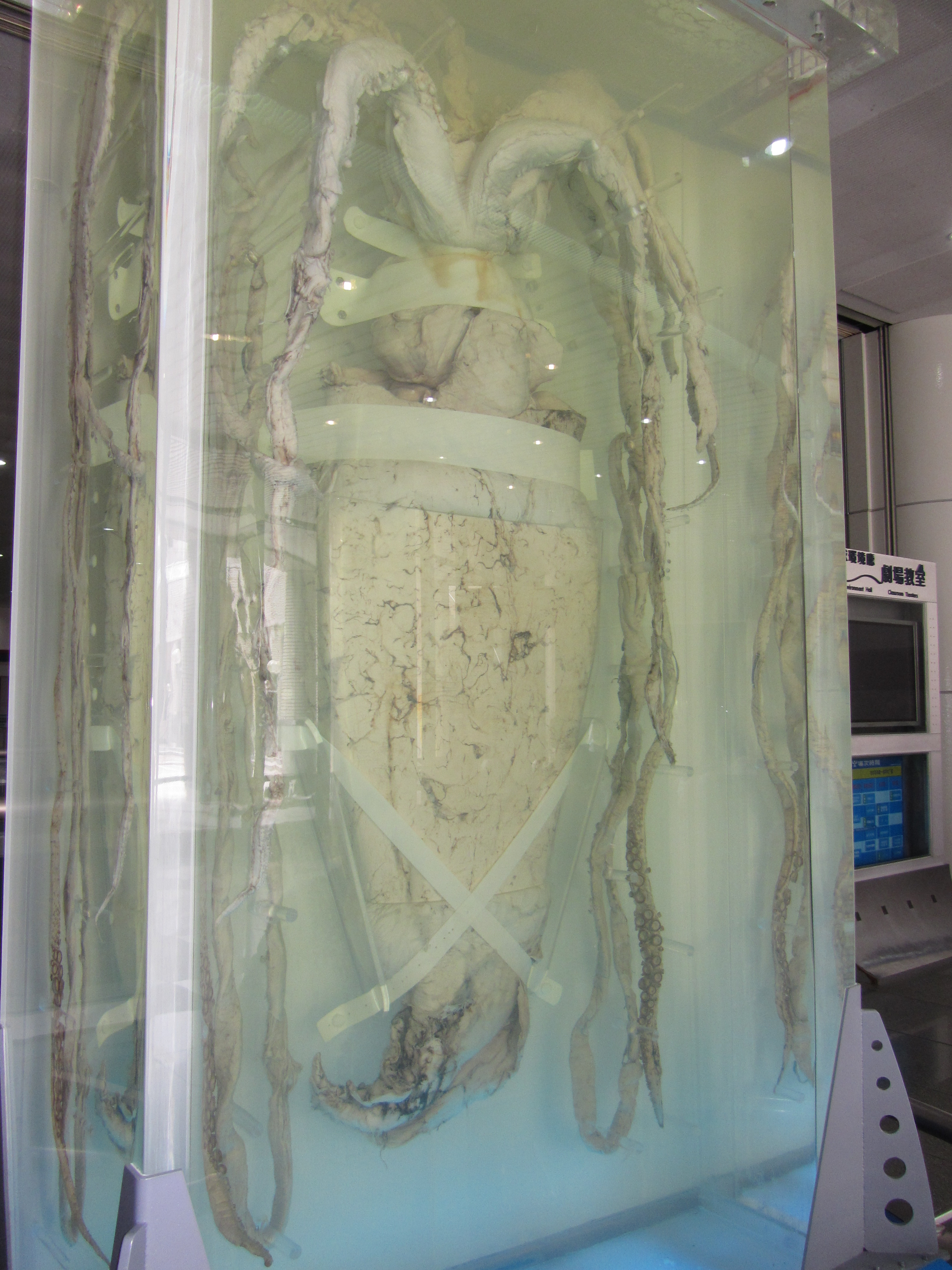
Architeuthis sanctipauli specimen exhibited in the National Museum of Natural Science, Taichung, Taiwan

The taxonomy of the giant squid, as with many cephalopod genera, has long been debated. Lumpers and splitters may propose as many as seventeen species or as few as one. The broadest list is:

- Architeuthis dux, Atlantic giant squid
- Architeuthis (Loligo) hartingii
- Architeuthis japonica
- Architeuthis kirkii
- Architeuthis (Megateuthis) martensii, North Pacific giant squid
- Architeuthis physeteris
- Architeuthis sanctipauli, southern giant squid
- Architeuthis (Steenstrupia) stockii
- Architeuthis (Loligo) bouyeri
- Architeuthis clarkei
- Architeuthis (Plectoteuthis) grandis
- Architeuthis (Megaloteuthis) harveyi
- Architeuthis longimanus
- Architeuthis monachus?
- Architeuthis nawaji
- Architeuthis princeps
- Architeuthis (Dubioteuthis) physeteris
- Architeuthis titan
- Architeuthis verrilli

It is unclear if these are distinct species, as no genetic or physical basis for distinguishing between them has yet been proposed.

In the 1984 FAO Species Catalogue of the Cephalopods of the World, Roper, et al. wrote:

Many species have been named in the sole genus of the family Architeuthidae, but they are so inadequately described and poorly understood that the systematics of the group is thoroughly confused.

In Cephalopods: A World Guide (2000), Mark Norman writes:

The number of species of giant squid is not known, although the general consensus amongst researchers is that there are at least three species, one in the Atlantic Ocean (Architeuthis dux), one in the Southern Ocean (A. sanctipauli) and at least one in the northern Pacific Ocean (A. martensi).

In March 2013, researchers at the University of Copenhagen suggested that, based on DNA research, there is only one species:

... researchers at the University of Copenhagen leading an international team, have discovered that no matter where in the world they are found, the fabled animals are so closely related at the genetic level that they represent a single, global population, and thus despite previous statements to the contrary, a single species worldwide.

== Timeline ==
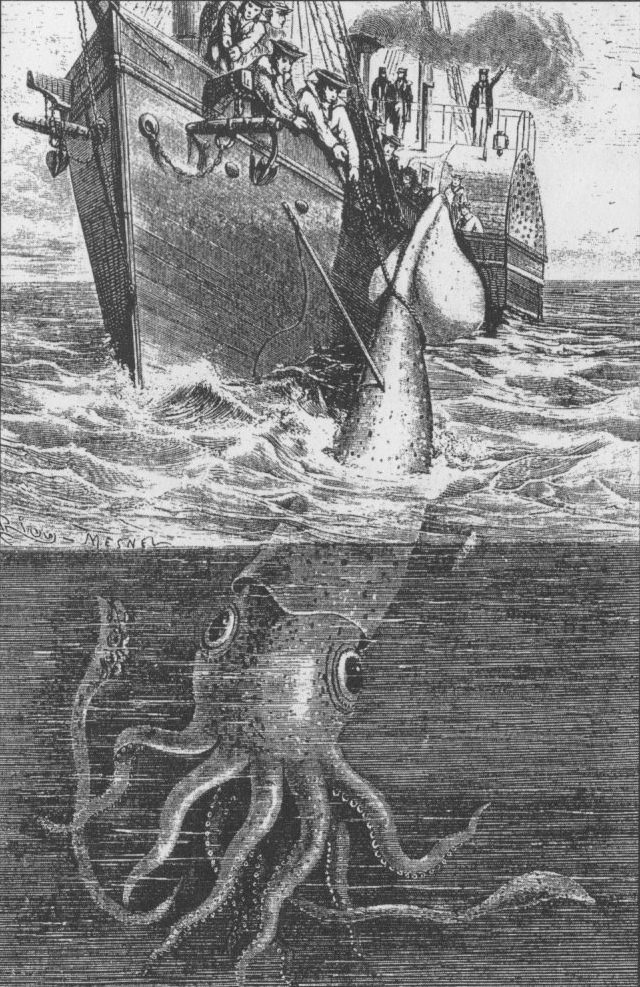
Alecton attempts to capture a giant squid in 1861

Aristotle, who lived in the fourth century BC, described a large squid, which he called teuthus, distinguishing it from the smaller squid, the teuthis. He mentions, "of the calamaries, the so-called teuthus is much bigger than the teuthis; for teuthi [plural of teuthus] have been found as much as five ells [5.7 m] long".

Pliny the Elder, living in the first century AD, also described a gigantic squid in his Natural History, with the head "as big as a cask", arms 9 m (30 ft) long, and carcass weighing 320 kg (700 lb).

Tales of giant squid have been common among mariners since ancient times, and may have led to the Norse legend of the kraken, a tentacled sea monster as large as an island capable of engulfing and sinking any ship. Japetus Steenstrup, the describer of Architeuthis, suggested a giant squid was the species described as a sea monk to the Danish king Christian III circa 1550. The Lusca of the Caribbean and Scylla in Greek mythology may also derive from giant squid sightings. Eyewitness accounts of other sea monsters like the sea serpent are also thought to be mistaken interpretations of giant squid. Nevertheless, the historian Otto Latva, who has studied the past interactions between humans and giant squid, has pointed out that many old stories about sea monsters were not associated with giant squid until the late 19th century. Latva has proposed that the giant squid was monsterized in the 19th century by natural historians and other writers. Regarding seafarers' relationship with giant squid, he explains it as being pragmatic: they did not perceive giant squid as monsters, but as sea animals that could be utilized in various ways.

Steenstrup wrote a number of papers on giant squid in the 1850s. He first used the term "Architeuthus" (this was the spelling he chose) in a paper in 1857. A portion of a giant squid was secured by the French corvette Alecton in 1861, leading to wider recognition of the genus in the scientific community. From 1870 to 1880, many squid were stranded on the shores of Newfoundland. For example, a specimen washed ashore in Thimble Tickle Bay, Newfoundland, on 2 November 1878; its mantle was reported to be 6.1 m (20 ft) long, with one tentacle 10.7 m (35 ft) long, and it was estimated as weighing 0.9 tonnes (1 short ton). Many of these specimens were not preserved, often being processed into manure or animal feed. In 1873, a squid "attacked" a dory near Bell Island, Newfoundland. Many strandings also occurred in New Zealand during the late 19th century.

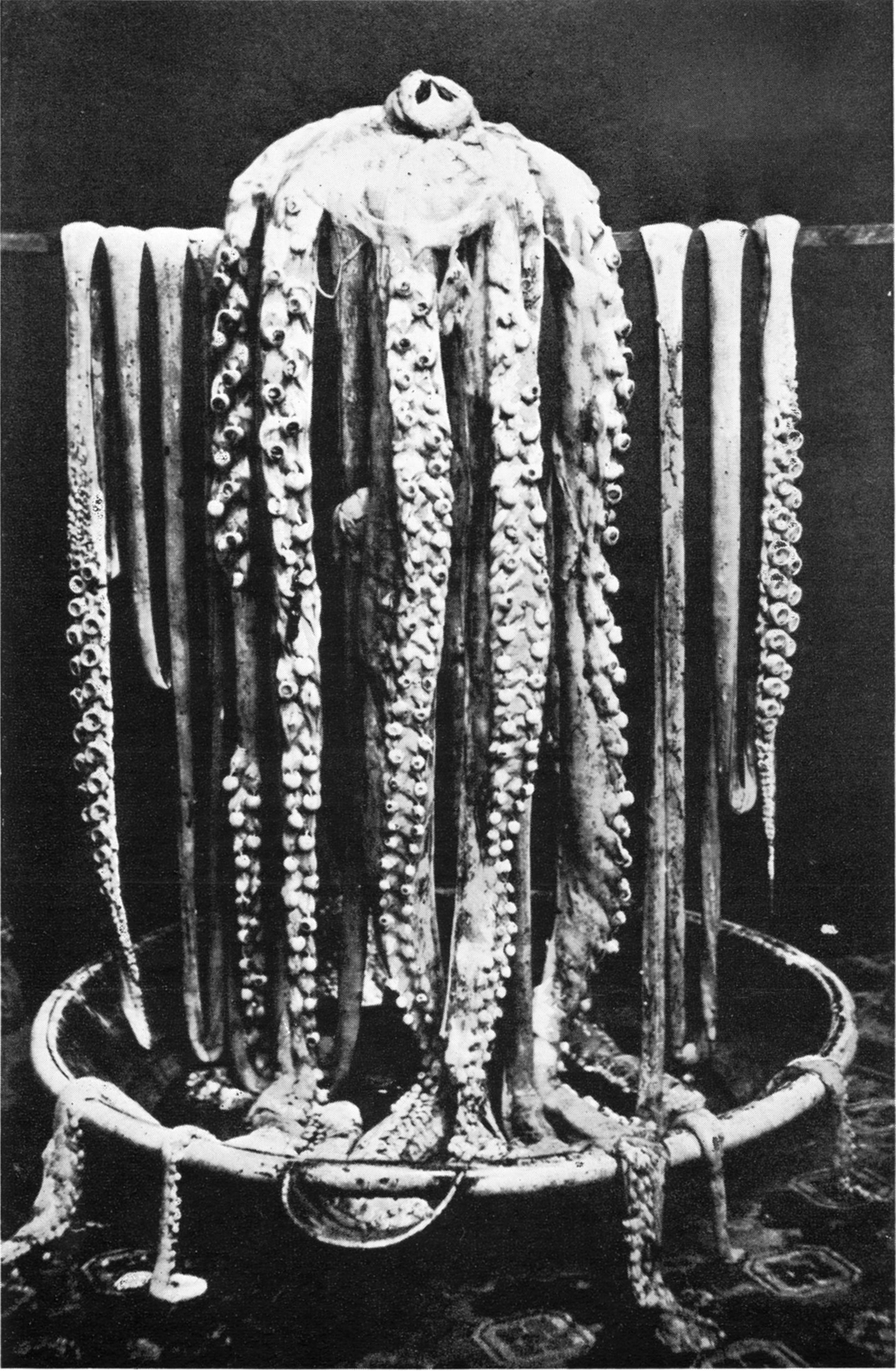
Giant squid from Logy Bay, Newfoundland, in Reverend Moses Harvey's bathtub, November/December 1873

Although strandings continue to occur sporadically throughout the world, none have been as frequent as those at Newfoundland and New Zealand in the 19th century. It is not known why giant squid become stranded on shore, but it may be because the distribution of deep, cold water where squid live is temporarily altered. Many scientists who have studied squid mass strandings believe they are cyclical and predictable. The length of time between strandings is not known, but was proposed to be 90 years by Architeuthis specialist Frederick Aldrich. Aldrich used this value to correctly predict a relatively small stranding that occurred between 1961 and 1968.

In 2004, another giant squid, later named "Archie", was caught off the coast of the Falkland Islands by a fishing trawler. It was 8.62 m (28.3 ft) long and was sent to the Natural History Museum in London to be studied and preserved. It was put on display on 1 March 2006 at the Darwin Centre. The find of such a large, complete specimen is very rare, as most specimens are in a poor condition, having washed up dead on beaches or been retrieved from the stomachs of dead sperm whales.

Researchers undertook a painstaking process to preserve the body. It was transported to England on ice aboard a trawler, then defrosted, which took about four days. The major difficulty was that thawing the thick mantle took much longer than the tentacles. To prevent the tentacles from rotting, scientists covered them in ice packs, and bathed the mantle in water. Then they injected the squid with a formol-saline solution to prevent rotting. It is now on show in a 9 m (30 ft) glass tank at the Darwin Centre of the Natural History Museum.

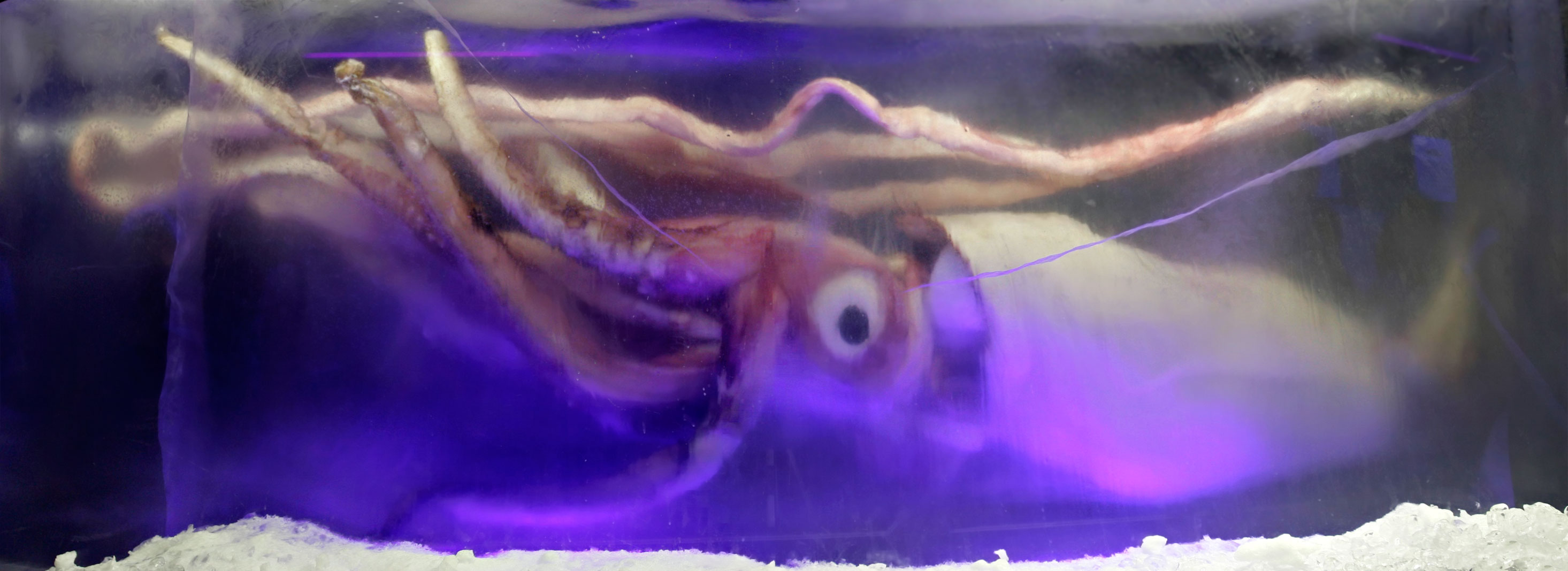
The giant squid specimen preserved in a block of ice at the Melbourne Aquarium

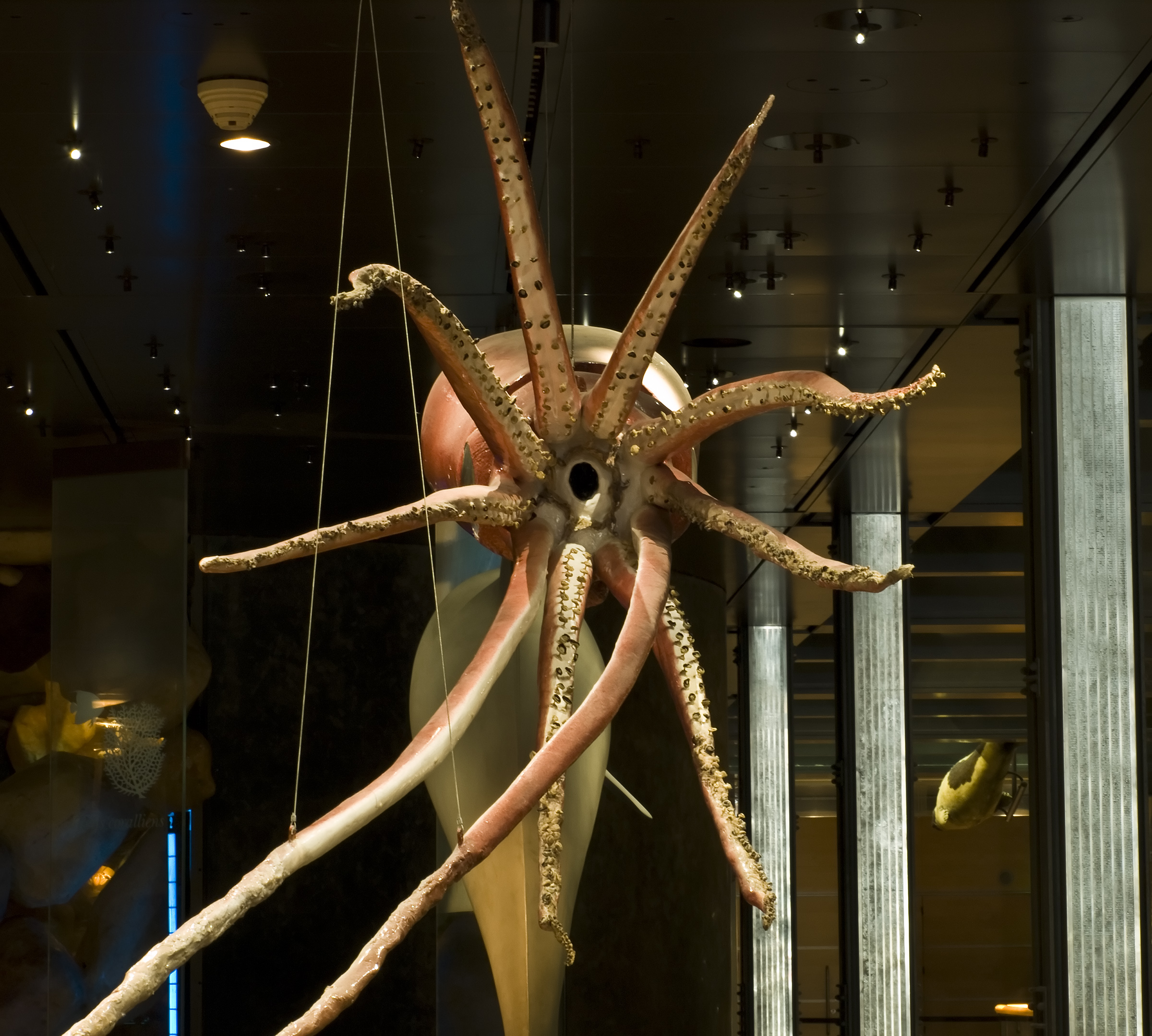
Specimen of giant squid nicknamed Wheke plastinated from 2005 and displayed on 26 March 2008 in the Grande galerie de l'Évolution of the National Museum of Natural History in Paris

In December 2005, the Melbourne Aquarium in Australia paid A$100,000 for the intact body of a 7-metre-long (23 ft) giant squid, preserved in a giant block of ice, which had been caught by fishermen off the coast of New Zealand's South Island that year.

The number of known giant squid specimens was close to 700 in 2011, and new ones are reported each year. Around 30 of these specimens are exhibited at museums and aquaria worldwide. The Museo del Calamar Gigante in Luarca, Spain, had by far the largest collection on public display, but many of the museum's specimens were destroyed during a storm in February 2014.

The search for a live Architeuthis specimen includes attempts to find live young, including larvae. The larvae closely resemble those of Nototodarus and Onykia, but are distinguished by the shape of the mantle attachment to the head, the tentacle suckers, and the beaks.

=== Images and video of live animals ===
By the turn of the 21st century, the giant squid remained one of the few extant megafauna to have never been photographed alive, either in the wild or in captivity. Marine biologist and author Richard Ellis described it as "the most elusive image in natural history". In 1993, an image purporting to show a diver with a live giant squid (identified as Architeuthis dux) was published in the book European Seashells. However, the animal in this photograph was a sick or dying Onykia robusta, not a giant squid. The first footage of live (larval) giant squid ever captured on film was in 2001. The footage was shown on Chasing Giants: On the Trail of the Giant Squid on the Discovery Channel.

==== First images of live adult ====
The specimen from Goshiki beach is seen here tied with a rope, its delicate skin only partially intact. Muscular constriction around the squid's eye obscures much of its surface in this image.

The first image of a live mature giant squid was taken on 15 January 2002, on Goshiki beach, Amino Cho, Kyoto Prefecture, Japan. The animal, which measured about 2 m (6 ft 7 in) in mantle length and 4 m (13 ft) in total length, was found near the water's surface. It was captured and tied to a quay, where it died overnight. The specimen was identified by Koutarou Tsuchiya of the Tokyo University of Fisheries. It is on display at the National Science Museum of Japan.

==== First observations in the wild ====
The first photographs of a live giant squid in its natural habitat were taken on 30 September 2004, by Tsunemi Kubodera (National Science Museum of Japan) and Kyoichi Mori (Ogasawara Whale Watching Association). Their teams had worked together for nearly two years to accomplish this. They used a five-ton fishing boat and only two crew members. The images were created on their third trip to a known sperm whale hunting ground 970 km (600 mi) south of Tokyo, where they had dropped a 900 m (3,000 ft) line baited with squid and shrimp. The line also held a camera and a flash. After over twenty tries that day, an 8 m (26 ft) giant squid attacked the lure and snagged its tentacle. The camera took over 500 photos before the squid managed to break free after four hours. The squid's 5.5 m (18 ft) tentacle remained attached to the lure. Later DNA tests confirmed the animal as a giant squid.

One of the series of images of a live giant squid taken by Kubodera and Mori in 2004

On 27 September 2005, Kubodera and Mori released the photographs to the world. The photo sequence, taken at a depth of 900 metres (3,000 ft) off Japan's Ogasawara Islands, shows the squid homing in on the baited line and enveloping it in "a ball of tentacles". The researchers were able to locate the likely general location of giant squid by closely tailing the movements of sperm whales. According to Kubodera, "we knew that they fed on the squid, and we knew when and how deep they dived, so we used them to lead us to the squid". Kubodera and Mori reported their observations in the journal Proceedings of the Royal Society.

Among other things, the observations demonstrate actual hunting behaviors of adult Architeuthis, a subject on which there had been much speculation. The photographs showed an aggressive hunting pattern by the baited squid, leading to it impaling a tentacle on the bait ball's hooks. This may disprove the theory that the giant squid is a drifter which eats whatever floats by, rarely moving so as to conserve energy. The observations suggest that the species has a much more aggressive feeding technique.

==== First video of live adult in natural habitat ====
In November 2006, American explorer and diver Scott Cassell led an expedition to the Gulf of California with the aim of filming a giant squid in its natural habitat. The team employed a novel filming method: using a Humboldt squid carrying a specially designed camera clipped to its fin. The camera-bearing squid caught on film what was claimed to be a giant squid, with an estimated length of 12 metres (40 ft), engaging in predatory behavior. The footage aired a year later on a History Channel program, MonsterQuest: Giant Squid Found. Cassell subsequently distanced himself from this documentary, claiming that it contained multiple factual and scientific errors.

In July 2012, a crew from television networks NHK and Discovery Channel captured what was described as "the first-ever footage of a live giant squid in its natural habitat". The footage was revealed on a NHK Special on 13 January 2013, and was shown on Discovery Channel's show Monster Squid: The Giant Is Real on 27 January 2013, and on Giant Squid: Filming the Impossible – Natural World Special on BBC Two. To capture the footage the team aboard OceanX's vessel MV Alucia traveled to the Ogasawara Islands, south of Tokyo and utilized the ship's crewed submersibles. The squid was about 3 m (9.8 ft) long and was missing its feeding tentacles, likely from a failed attack by a sperm whale. It was drawn into viewing range by both artificial bioluminescence created to mimic panicking Atolla jellyfish and by using a Thysanoteuthis rhombus (diamond squid) as bait. The giant squid was filmed feeding for about 23 minutes by Tsunemi Kubodera until it departed. The technique of using unobtrusive viewing and bioluminescence luring of the squid with quiet unobtrusive platforms was described by Edith Widder, a member of the expedition.

==== Second video of giant squid in natural habitat ====
On 19 June 2019, in an expedition run by the National Oceanic & Atmospheric Association (NOAA), known as the Journey into Midnight, biologists Nathan J. Robinson and Edith Widder captured a video of a juvenile giant squid at a depth of 759 m (2,490 ft) in the Gulf of Mexico. Michael Vecchione, a NOAA Fisheries zoologist, confirmed that the captured footage was that of the genus Architeuthis, and that the individual filmed measured at somewhere between 3.0 and 3.7 m (10 and 12 ft).

==== Other sightings ====
Videos of live giant squids have been occasionally captured near the surface since the 2012 sighting, with one of these aforementioned individuals being guided back into the open ocean after appearing in Toyama Harbor on 24 December 2015. The majority of these sightings were of sick or dying individuals that had come up to the surface.

== Aquarium keeping ==
The giant squid cannot be kept in aquariums due to its hard-to-reach habitat, body size, and special needs. In 2022, a live specimen was found off the coast of Japan, and an attempt was made to transport it to the Echizen Matsushima Aquarium in the city of Sakai. The squid died and was placed on display in the aquarium.

== Cultural depictions ==
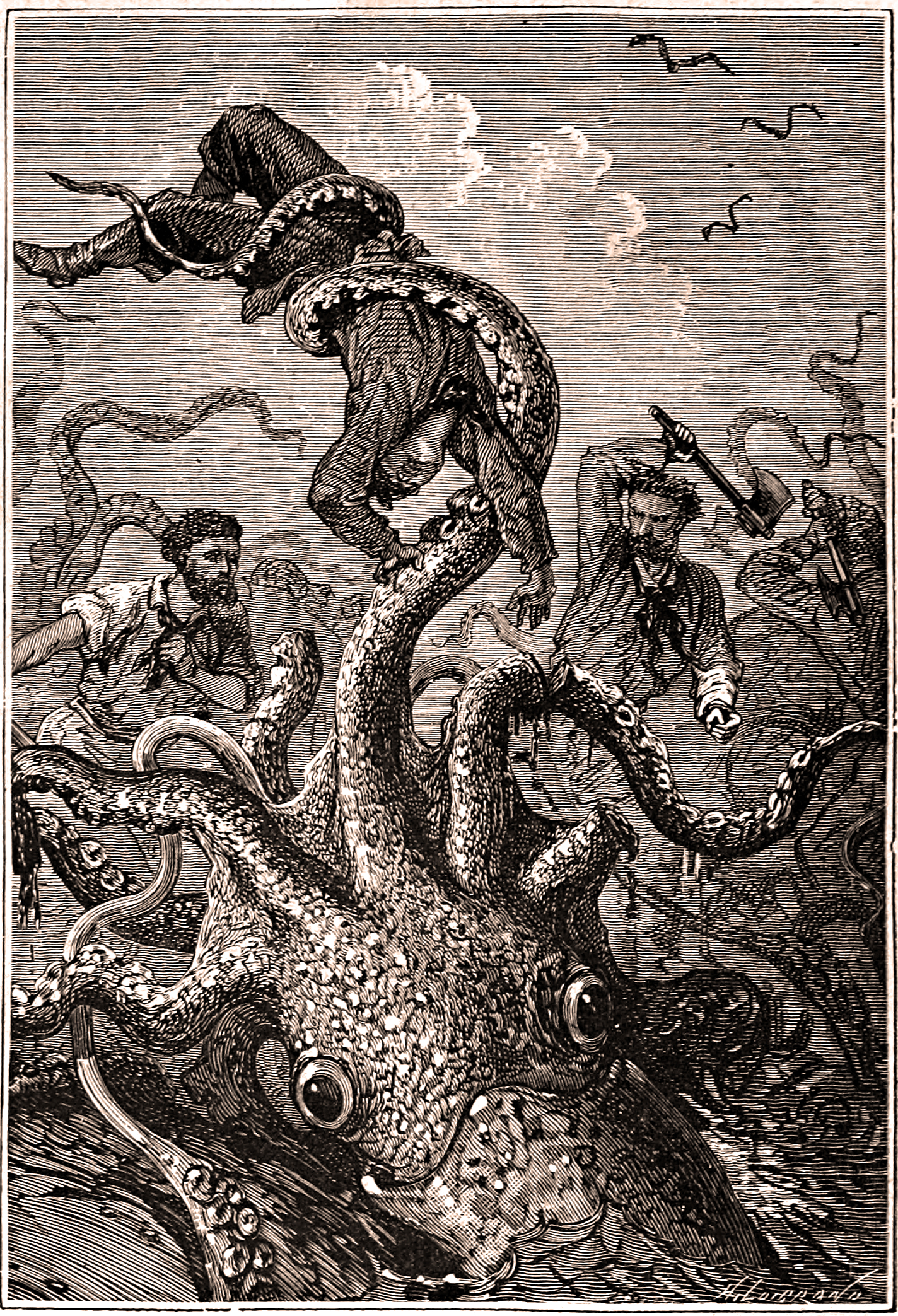
An illustration from the original edition of Twenty Thousand Leagues Under the Seas depicting a giant squid

Representations of the giant squid have been known from early legends of the kraken through books such as Moby-Dick and Jules Verne's 1870 novel Twenty Thousand Leagues Under the Seas on to other novels such as Ian Fleming's Dr. No, Peter Benchley's Beast (adapted as a film called The Beast), and Michael Crichton's Sphere (adapted as a film).

In particular, the image of a giant squid locked in battle with a sperm whale is a common one, although the squid is the whale's prey and not an equal combatant.

== See also ==
- Colossal squid, the largest squid species by mass
- Enteroctopus, a genus whose members are commonly known as giant octopuses
- Giant Squid Interpretation Site, a small museum in Glovers Harbour, Newfoundland
- Gigantic octopus, a hypothesised species of octopus
- Humboldt squid, a large species of squid and the only member of the genus Dosidicus
- Largest organisms
- Taningia danae, a large squid species of the genus Taningia
- Cephalopod attack
