= Great Barrier Reef (2015 TV series) =

David Attenborough series

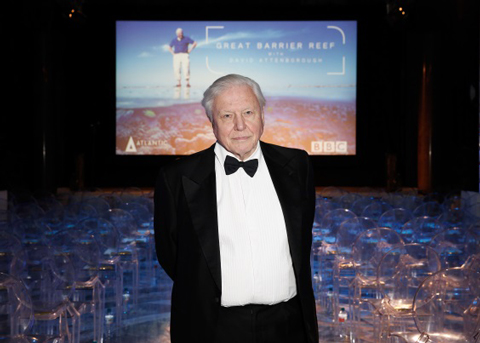
- David Attenborough at a special screening of the series at Australia House, London
- Genre: Nature documentary
- Written by: David Attenborough
- Directed by: Michael Davis and Anne Sommerfield
- Narrated by: David Attenborough
- Country of origin: United Kingdom
- Original language: English
- No. of series: 1
- No. of episodes: 3

Production
- Producer: Anne Sommerfield
- Running time: 60 minutes

Original release
- Network: BBC One; BBC One HD
- Release: 30 December 2015 – 13 January 2016

Great Barrier Reef is a three-part BBC documentary series. Narrated by David Attenborough, its three episodes aired over December 2015 and into January 2016. The series was released on DVD and Blu-ray in January 2016.

The MV Alucia was used as a base for the series.

== Synopses ==
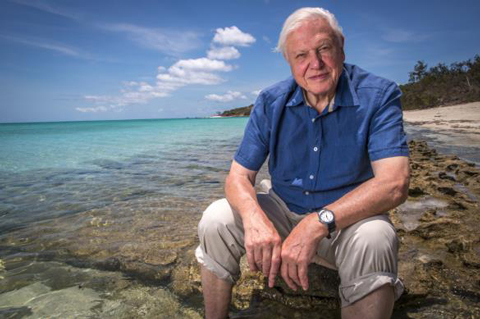
David Attenborough in one of the episodes

=== Episode 1: Builders ===
This episode explores the creatures that inhabit the Great Barrier Reef off the northeastern coast of Australia on board the research vessel MV Alucia. Attenborough goes deep into the ocean on board Alucia's Triton submersible. He pays a visit to Lizard Island.

=== Episode 2: Visitors ===
Attenborough starts out on Osprey Reef. Hammerhead sharks pick up signals from the Earth's magnetic field. Some sharks travel to Raine Island. Attenborough goes to a green turtle rookery on Raine Island.

Heron Island is to the south of Raine Island.

Manta rays are the nomads of the Great Barrier Reef. Manta rays feed on the plankton. Many of these manta rays make their way to Lady Elliot Island. Kathy Townsend has been tracking manta rays and studying them for the last seven years.

=== Episode 3: Survival ===
Cyclones are the biggest killers of the reef's corals. SS Yongala was sunk by a cyclone in 1911. Cyclone Yasi in 2011 ripped many corals and exposed the top of the sunken Yongala.

Another threat to corals are coral-eating starfishes known as crown-of-thorns starfishes.

The Making of David Attenborough's Great Barrier Reef

50-minute 'Making of' the series special episode.

== Animals featured ==
=== Episode 1 ===
Attenborough discusses reef residents.

- coral polyps
- clownfish
- sea anemone
- mantis shrimp with up to 16 photoreceptors

=== Episode 2 ===
- tiger shark
- Green sea turtle
- noddies
- Wedge-tailed shearwater
- wrasse, small fish
- humpback whales
- dwarf minke whale

=== Episode 3 ===
- Epaulette shark
- Crown-of-thorns starfish

== Contributors ==
Experts who appeared in the series include:

- Kathy Townsend
- Justin Marshall
