= MV Alucia =

Research ship from the Marshall Islands

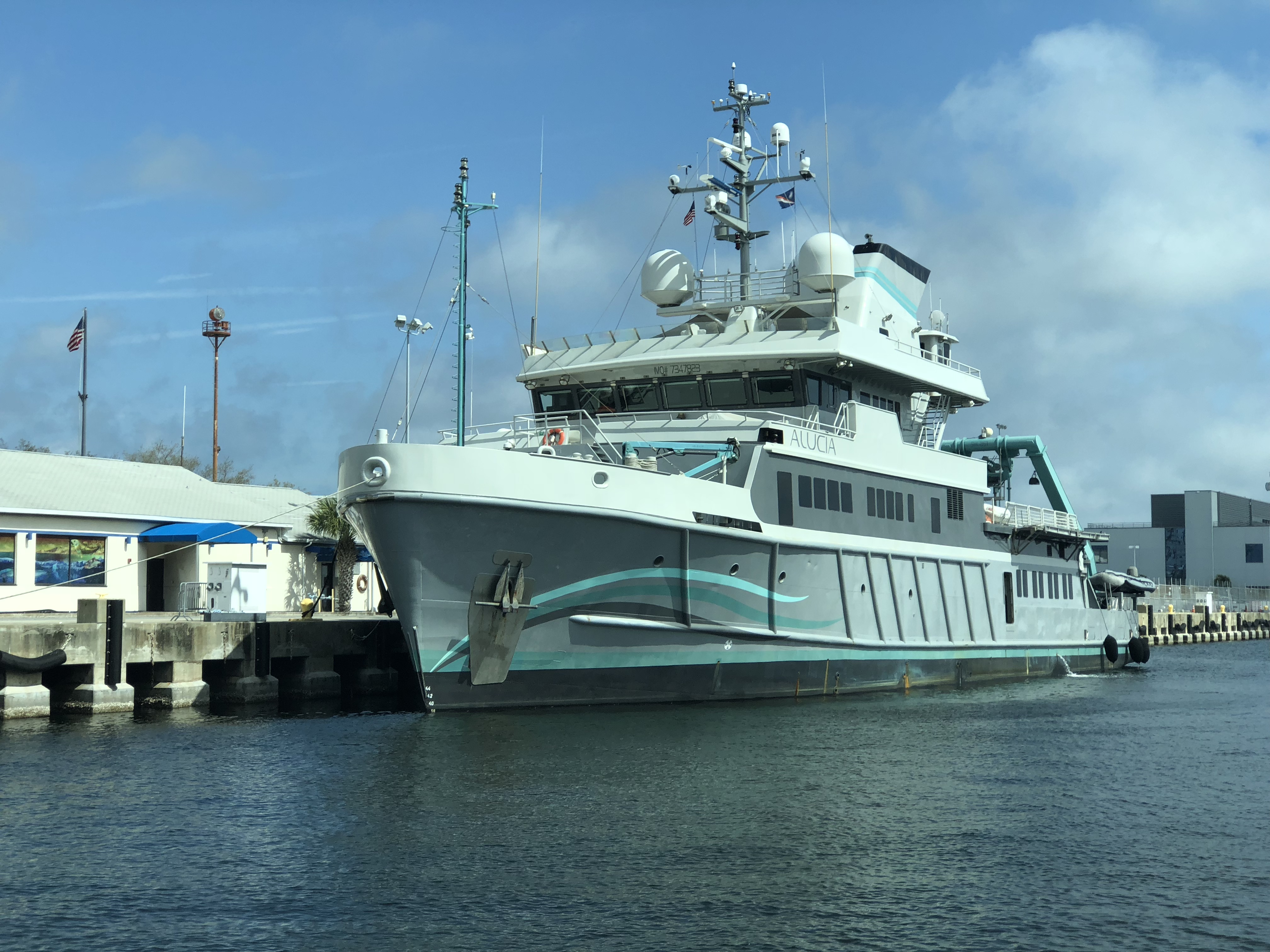
- The MV Alucia docked at the Port of St. Petersburg in February 2019

History
- Name: MV Odyssey
- Port of registry: Marshall Islands
- Identification: IMO number: 7347823
- Notes: Completely re-built 2008; Refitted 2016; Changed name from MV Alucia 2022

History
- Name: Nadir
- Builder: Ateliers et Chantiers C. Auroux, Arcachon, France
- Launched: October 1974
- Identification: IMO number: 7347823
- Notes: built as submarine tender

General characteristics
- Class & type: Special Purpose Research Vessel
- Tonnage: 1396 GT
- Length: 56.18 m (184 ft 4 in)
- Beam: 11.89 m (39 ft 0 in)
- Draft: 4.95 m (16 ft 3 in)
- Depth: 5.51 m (18 ft 1 in)
- Installed power: 3,200 hp (2,400 kW) total
- Propulsion: 2 × Cummins KTA50M2
- Speed: 12 knots
- Range: 7,500 nm
- Capacity: 44
- Crew: 22

MV Odyssey (formerly Alucia) is a 56-meter research and exploration vessel that facilitates a wide range of diving, submersible and aerial operations. The ship has recently been used by OCEEF, under the name Alucia and was previously utilized by initiative OceanX for ocean exploration, research and filming missions. She is now on Charter to the InkFish group and going into refit shortly.

== History ==
Odyssey was built as a heavy lift ship with a launch platform for diving and submersible operations in 1974 in Auroux, France as the RV Nadir. In 1984 it was purchased by the French oceanographic institute IFREMER and in 2004 by DeepOcean Quest. It was subsequently purchased by Bridgewater Associates founder Ray Dalio to support and facilitate ocean exploration and research. In 2012, Mark Dalio founded Alucia Productions (now OceanX Media) to film and chronicle ocean exploration and research missions aboard the Alucia.

== Features ==
Odyssey has two submarines, the Triton Submarines 3300/3 (named Nadir) and the Deep Rover 2, both rated for a maximum depth of 1,000 m (3,300 ft). The ship also has an AStar helicopter and helipad; dry and wet science labs; 8K Red cameras, low-light submersible cameras and custom underwater camera housings; and a media room.

== Missions ==
Notable missions aboard Odyssey have included:

- The 2011 search for Air France Flight 447
- Filming of David Attenborough's Emmy Award-winning series Great Barrier Reef
- Filming of BBC Earth's Blue Planet II (with OceanX Media)
- Capturing the first-ever footage of the Giant Squid
- Exploring the ocean's blue holes for the Emmy Award-winning series Years of Living Dangerously

== Scientific Literature from MV Odyssey Missions ==
Winkler, TS, van Hengstum, PJ, Donnelly, JP, Wallace, EJ, Sullivan, RM, MacDonald, D, Albury, NA, 2020, Revising evidence of hurricane strikes on Abaco Island (The Bahamas) over the last 700 years. Scientific Reports 10: Article number: 16556,.

Wallace, EJ, Donnelly, JP, van Hengstum, PJ, Winkler, TS, McKeon, K, MacDonald, D, d’Entremont, NE, Sullivan, RM, Woodruff, JD, Hawkes, AD, Maio, C, 2021a, 1050 years of hurricane strikes on Long Island in The Bahamas, Paleoceanography and Paleoclimatology, 36 (3), e2020PA004156..

Wallace, EJ, Donnelly, JP, van Hengstum, P, Winkler, TS, Dizon, C, Labella, A, Lopez, I. d’Entremont, NE, Sullivan, R, Woodruff, J, Hawkes, A, Maio, M, 2021b, Regional shifts in paleo hurricane activity over the last 1500 years derived from blue hole sediments offshore of Middle Caicos Island, Quaternary Science Reviews, 268, 107126.

Winkler, TS, van Hengstum, PJ, Donnelly, JP, Wallace, EJ, d’Entremont, NE, Hawkes, AD, Maio, CV, Sullivan, RM, Woodruff, JD, 2022, Oceanic passage of hurricanes across Cay Sal Bank in The Bahamas over the last 550 years, Marine Geology, 443, article 106653,.

Yang, W, Wallace, E, Vecchi, GA, Donnelly, JP, Emile-Geay, J, Hakim, GJ, Horowitz, LW, Sullivan, RM, Tardif, R, van Hengstum PJ, Winkler, TS, 2024, Last millennium hurricane activity linked to endogenous climate variability. Nature Communications 15, 2024..
