= Ogasawara Whale Watching Association =

Association that regulates whale watching in the Ogasawara Islands

The Ogasawara Whale Watching Association is an association that regulates whale watching in the Ogasawara Islands. Since 1989 the Ogasawara Whale Watching Association has been conducting research on and educating people about whales. The Ogasawara Whale Watching Association also offers whale watching tours.

== Giant squid sighting ==
On September 30, 2004, researchers from the National Science Museum of Japan and the Ogasawara Whale Watching Association took the first images of a live giant squid in its natural habitat. Several of the 556 photographs were released a year later. The same team successfully filmed a live giant squid for the first time on December 4, 2006.
