= Star Wars Hyperspace Mountain =

Roller coaster at Disneyland Paris

Star Wars: Hyperspace Mountain
- Previously known as Space Mountain: De la Terre à la Lune (1995-2005, TBA-); Space Mountain: Mission 2 (2005-2017)
- Star Wars Hyperspace Mountain in 2015

Disneyland Paris
- Location: Disneyland Paris
- Park section: Discoveryland
- Coordinates: 48°52′26.69″N 2°46′45.30″E
- Status: Operating
- Opening date: June 1, 1995; 31 years ago (as De la Terre à la Lune); April 9, 2005; 21 years ago (as Space Mountain: Mission 2); May 7, 2017; 9 years ago (as Hyperspace Mountain); 2028; 2 years' time (as De la Terre à la Lune)
- Closing date: January 15, 2005 (as De la Terre à la Lune); January 8, 2017 (as Space Mountain: Mission 2); 2027 (as Hyperspace Mountain)
- Cost: US$90 million

General statistics
- Type: Steel – Launched – Enclosed
- Manufacturer: Vekoma
- Designer: Walt Disney Imagineering; Werner Stengel
- Lift/launch system: Electric Winch Launch / Booster wheels (second lift)
- Height: 105 ft (32 m)
- Length: 3,281 ft (1,000 m)
- Speed: 44 mph (71 km/h)
- Inversions: 3
- Duration: 2:15
- Capacity: 1980 riders per hour
- G-force: 5
- Height restriction: 47.2 in (120 cm)
- Trains: 4 trains with 6 cars; riders arranged 2 across in 2 rows for a total of 24 riders per train
- Sponsors: De la Terre à la Lune (1995-2005) Mission 2 (2005-2017) None (2017-present)
- Current Theme: Star Wars
- Music: Star Wars theme by John Williams (2017-2027); Mission 2 by Michael Giacchino (2005–2017); De La Terre à la Lune by Steven Bramson (1995–2005; returning 2027)
- Disney Premier Access available
- Single rider line available
- Must transfer from wheelchair
- Star Wars: Hyperspace Mountain at RCDB

Star Wars: Hyperspace Mountain (formerly known as Space Mountain: Mission 2 and Space Mountain: De la Terre à la Lune) is an indoor/outdoor steel roller coaster in Discoveryland at Disneyland Paris. Originally themed around Jules Verne's classic 1865 novel From the Earth to the Moon, the attraction first opened on June 1, 1995, three years after the park's debut in an attempt to draw more guests to the financially unstable European resort. Unlike other Space Mountain attractions at Disney theme parks, the installation at Disneyland Paris had a steampunk-detailed appearance with a Columbiad Cannon and a plate-and-rivet exterior under its previous theme. It is the only Space Mountain to feature inversions, a launch, a section of track that exits and re-enters the interior, and a synchronized on-Board audio track. It is by far the largest Space Mountain installation at any Disney theme park.

The original Space Mountain: De la Terre à la Lune closed on January 15, 2005, and later reopened as Space Mountain: Mission 2. This version of the ride used the same track layout, but without the Jules Verne theme. A refurbishment took place in 2015 to improve the special effects and overall presentation. A Star Wars theme was implemented into the ride in 2017 to celebrate the resort's 25th anniversary. The latest renovation is set to happen at the end of 2027, with the removal of the Star Wars branding in favor of restoring the original Space Mountain: De la Terre à la Lune.

== Original concept ==
Originally, Disneyland Paris wanted to make the Parisian and European Version a replica of Space Mountain from Tokyo Disneyland. However, after the Parisian site had been chosen and work began on Discoveryland, a showcase attraction was planned. Discovery Mountain was initially designed to feature not only Space Mountain, but a variety of other attractions, exhibits, and restaurants. The building was originally going to be 100 metres in diameter but was later shrunk to a diameter of 61 metres.

Inside, the following items were to feature:

- A large version of the Nautilus (which ended up outside of the attraction and as a walk-through attraction)
- An underwater restaurant with a Nautilus theme alongside a café
- A copy of the Horizons attraction of Epcot
- A Disneyland Railroad stop
- Free-fall ride concept, themed to Jules Verne's Journey to the Center of the Earth
- Space Mountain based upon Jules Verne's From the Earth to the Moon
- Walkway tubes linking to CinéMagique and the Videopolis dining and stage complex (which still features two huge windows in that place)

The budget for Discovery Mountain became so huge that cuts were inevitable. In addition, the resort had encountered a loss of millions of French francs in its first three years of operations. This was due to low hotel occupancy, low guest spending and lower attendance than projected, partly due to the colder winter weather—in sharp contrast to Tokyo Disneyland, which sees crowds year-round regardless of the weather. The Victorian-inspired design of Space Mountain (initially named Discovery Mountain before its name change), with its huge Columbiad cannon, and containing the only indoor roller coaster, was decided upon as the best choice for the financially unstable resort, as well as a nearby walk-through recreation of the Nautilus, entitled Les Mystères du Nautilus.

However, in 2001, Tokyo DisneySea opened, featuring Mysterious Island, a recreation of Vulcania Island from the movie 20,000 Leagues Under the Sea. This island features some elements from Discovery Mountain (for example the ride Journey to the Center of the Earth or the Nautilus ride). Michael Eisner, ex-CEO of The Walt Disney Company, credited Space Mountain: De la Terre à la Lune and its creator, Imagineer Tim Delaney, as the savior of Disneyland Paris.

== Attraction ==
=== De la Terre à la Lune/From the Earth to the Moon (1995–2005) ===
An extravagant version of Space Mountain had been planned since the inception of the Euro Disney Resort but was reserved for a revival of public interest. Located in Discoveryland, the park's alternative for Tomorrowland, this Space Mountain was originally designed as a view on space travel from a Jules Verne-era perspective, based on the 1865 Jules Verne novel From the Earth to the Moon.

This was the tallest and the fastest version of any Space Mountain attraction and the only one to include inversions and to feature a portion of track outside the mountain itself (that being the station and the launch Cannon). When the ride originally opened in 1995, it was the first full-circuit launched roller coaster. The $89.7 million attraction features a 1.3G uphill catapult launch from 0 to 44 mph (71 km/h) in 1.8s, and three inversions (sidewinder, corkscrew, and a cutback). It was the first roller coaster to feature on-board music, known as a SOBAT (Synchronized On-Board Audio Track). SOBATs would later be added to Space Mountain at Disneyland, and Space Mountain at Hong Kong Disneyland.

From 1995 to 2005, the ride was known as Space Mountain: De la Terre à la Lune. Space Mountain's first SOBAT was composed by Steven Bramson. It was inspired by John Williams's film scores and the 20,000 Leagues Under the Sea score. A music loop was used to create the proper Victorian atmosphere which featured themes from movies such as Krull, The Rocketeer, Always or Christopher Columbus: The Discovery.

Guests entered the mountain and got ushered into the inside queue known as the Stellar Way, an open walkway where guests could have a look at the coaster itself and see trains during their journey in space. Then, they reached the Victorian chambers of the Baltimore Gun Club (the Club which built the Cannon), and discovered the plans and drawings of the Columbiad and the journey to the Moon. They then boarded the ride vehicles, called "moontrains", made out of copper and bronze, in a Victorian themed station with hanging patriotic red, white and blue flags and barrels of gunpowder laid out on the sides of the embarcation platforms.

The trains took them through a tunnel into the Columbiad Cannon. As the blast-off occurs, trains suddenly got launched out of the Columbiad to the top of the mountain. The space travel started with riders passing through a field of asteroids and nearly coming into near collision with one. Unfortunately, the trains enter a huge asteroid field and they spin out of control. Afterwards they narrowly avoided being swallowed by Colonel Impey Barbicane's Blue Moon Mining Company Machine, an industrial space machine built by the President of the Gun Club to extract mineral resources from asteroids. After escaping the danger of this device, the trains passed through an opening in a large asteroid. After spinning through another asteroid field the trains would climb a lift with a projection of the moon at the top. The Moon itself had a smiling face (as seen in Georges Méliès' 1902 movie adaptation of the novel). If riders looked to their left, they could see a road sign placed on an asteroid saying "To the Moon 50.000km", and on the right they could see that Jules Verne himself, with the proper equipment, had landed on a nearby asteroid. The trains headed back to Earth while passing through another asteroid field. Riders would see bolts of light and light rays around the train as it heated up reentering Earth's atmosphere. The trains passed through the Electro-de-Velocitor, a machine that de-accelerated the trains to reduce their speed as they safely returned to the station.

In September 2004, Le Visionarium closed, leading to significant changes in Discoveryland. Space Mountain: De la Terre à la Lune was to be entirely refurbished for its tenth anniversary.

=== Space Mountain: Mission 2 (2005–2017) ===
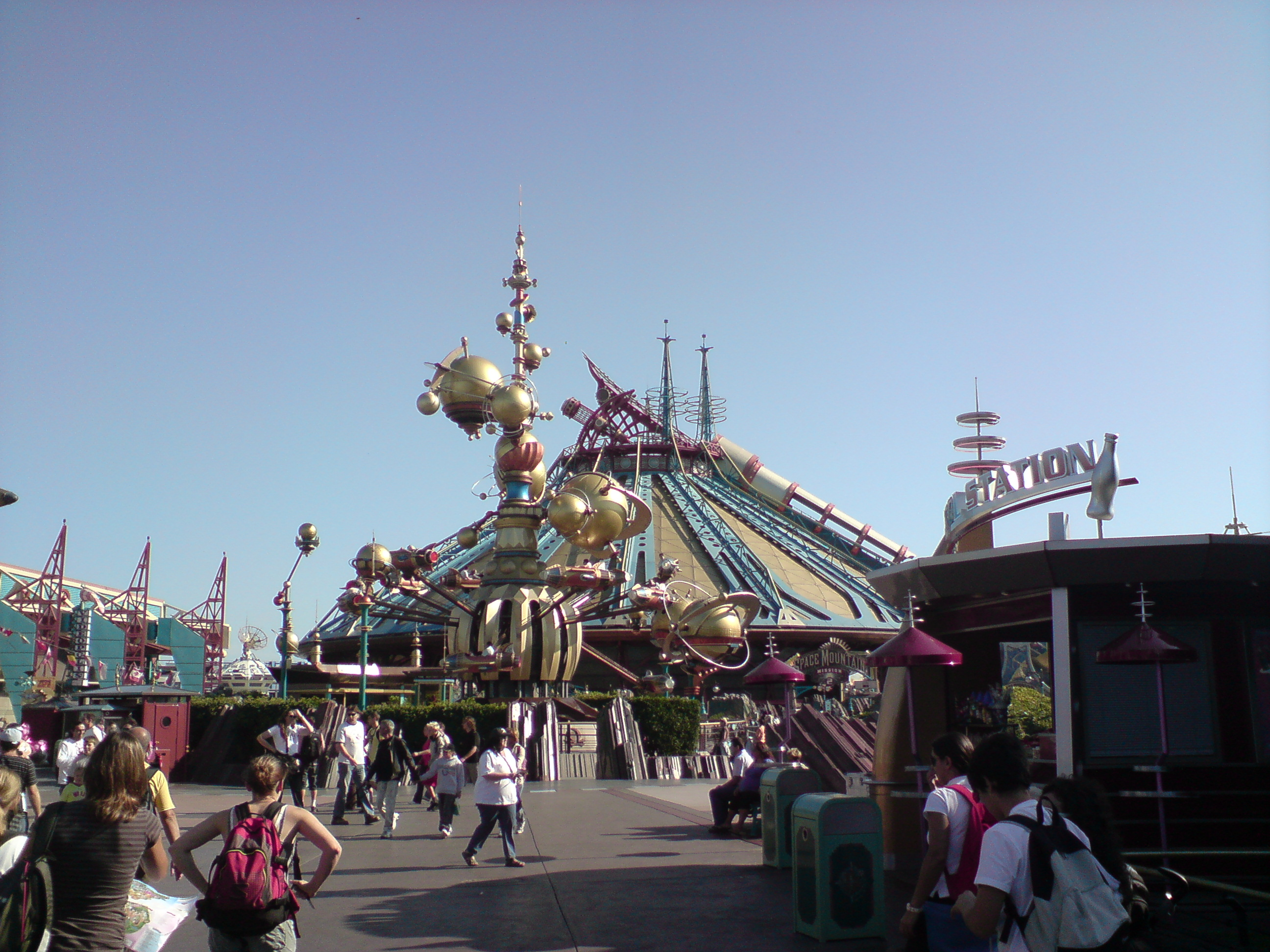
Space Mountain: Mission 2 as seen from the Discoveryland midway

In 2005, Space Mountain underwent modifications and was officially renamed Space Mountain: Mission 2 having already received a complete external repaint the year before. This journey took riders "beyond the Moon to the very edge of our universe." This required numerous aspects of the ride to be changed such as the effects during the ride. The smiling moon seen in the original was replaced with a supernova. The ending introduced curving neon lights to simulate a vortex.

Although the track remained unaltered, the trains were launched from the bottom of the cannon. Originally, they were launched at the top which was about halfway up the actual incline. The Victorian setting and theming was changed as well and received modern futuristic elements. The trains received a simple repaint from copper and bronze to silver. A new futuristic soundtrack was written by Michael Giacchino (who was also responsible for the SOBATs in the versions at Disneyland and Hong Kong Disneyland) and the Victorian loop in the queue was replaced with radio messages.

Guests entered the mountain on its side and were ushered into a futuristic and dimly lit corridor featuring photos of several cosmic phenomenon that replaced the former Stellar Way. A video could also be seen of a woman telling space travelers all about the mission and the safety restrictions before embarking on their journey. They then proceeded into the Victorian lounges of the Baltimore Gun Club which featured plans and drawings of the Columbiad Cannon and the journey to a supernova. Afterwards guests would enter the station and then board the trains.

The trains traveled through the tunnel leading them inside the cannon. A countdown was audible and the blast launched the trains beyond the moon. Space travellers encountered many outer space objects; such as a comet, planets, and several asteroids. Upon reaching the supernova, riders saw it explode and destroy its nearby surroundings. Riders began to return to Earth by passing through a field of melting asteroids. In order to reach Earth, the trains passed through a "hypergate", a red vortex-like wormhole which represented a shortcut through the universe. As in the previous version, the Electro-de-Velocitor slowed down the trains before returning to the station. From January–July 2015 the ride was refurbished which included the addition of a single rider queue and an overall enhancement of the effects.

=== Star Wars: Hyperspace Mountain (2017–2027) ===
Space Mountain: Mission 2 closed for renovation on January 8, 2017, and reopened on May 7, 2017, with a new theme as Star Wars: Hyperspace Mountain for the 25th Anniversary Celebration. Along with new Star Wars projections, permanent, blue, Victorian-styled Vekoma trains with shoulder vests were added. As a result of the new trains, the height requirement has since lowered down to 120 cm (47 in) from the original 132 cm (52 in).

After entering the dome, guests are ushered into a long black corridor with pictures of X-Wings, TIE-Fighters and other spaceships. A video can be seen of a woman telling space travelers all about the safety restrictions before embarking on their mission. They then proceed into the hall of the Baltimore Gun Club, where blueprints of the mission's propulsion device are shown. The device depicted is the columbiad, a fictional cannon designed to launch spacecraft into hyperspace at lightning speed. Guests then enter the loading station, where they board blue, Victorian-style rocket trains designed by Vekoma, and prepare to be catapulted deep into space. The trains move into a tunnel as the iconic Star Wars theme music plays before entering the cannon. The score for the attraction uses a medley of John Williams' Star Wars score, and it was recorded at Abbey Road Studios. After a brief lecture from Admiral Ackbar, a command to launch is given and the Columbiad fires, propelling the trains forward, accelerating to 44 mph (71 km/h) and launching into Hyperspace from Earth.

Upon arrival at Jakku, a group of TIES quickly ambushes the train, as it bobs and weaves its way through the dogfight as laser fire is volleyed between spaceships. With the TIES destroyed, the Blue Squadron fires at a nearby Star Destroyer, striking a critical blow to its bridge. Another jump into hyperspace is made sending the trains back to the station.

=== De la Terre à la Lune/From the Earth to the Moon Return (2027–) ===
At D23 2026, plans were announced to close Star Wars: Hyperspace Mountain by the end of 2027, with the ride being restored to its original De la Terre à la Lune theming.

== Public reception ==
When it first opened in 1995, the ride was well received with French guests who had been criticizing Disneyland Paris for not respecting their culture. Space Mountain was seen as an homage, and paid respect to the French visionaries of the 19th century. The rollercoaster's cutting-edge effects, architecture, storytelling and intense ride layout was praised by guests. Additionally, the ride's success allowed Disneyland Paris to see its first profits, after the financial troubles the company had run through shortly after opening the park.

== See also ==
- Big Thunder Mountain
- Splash Mountain
