= Michael Giacchino =

American music composer (born 1967)

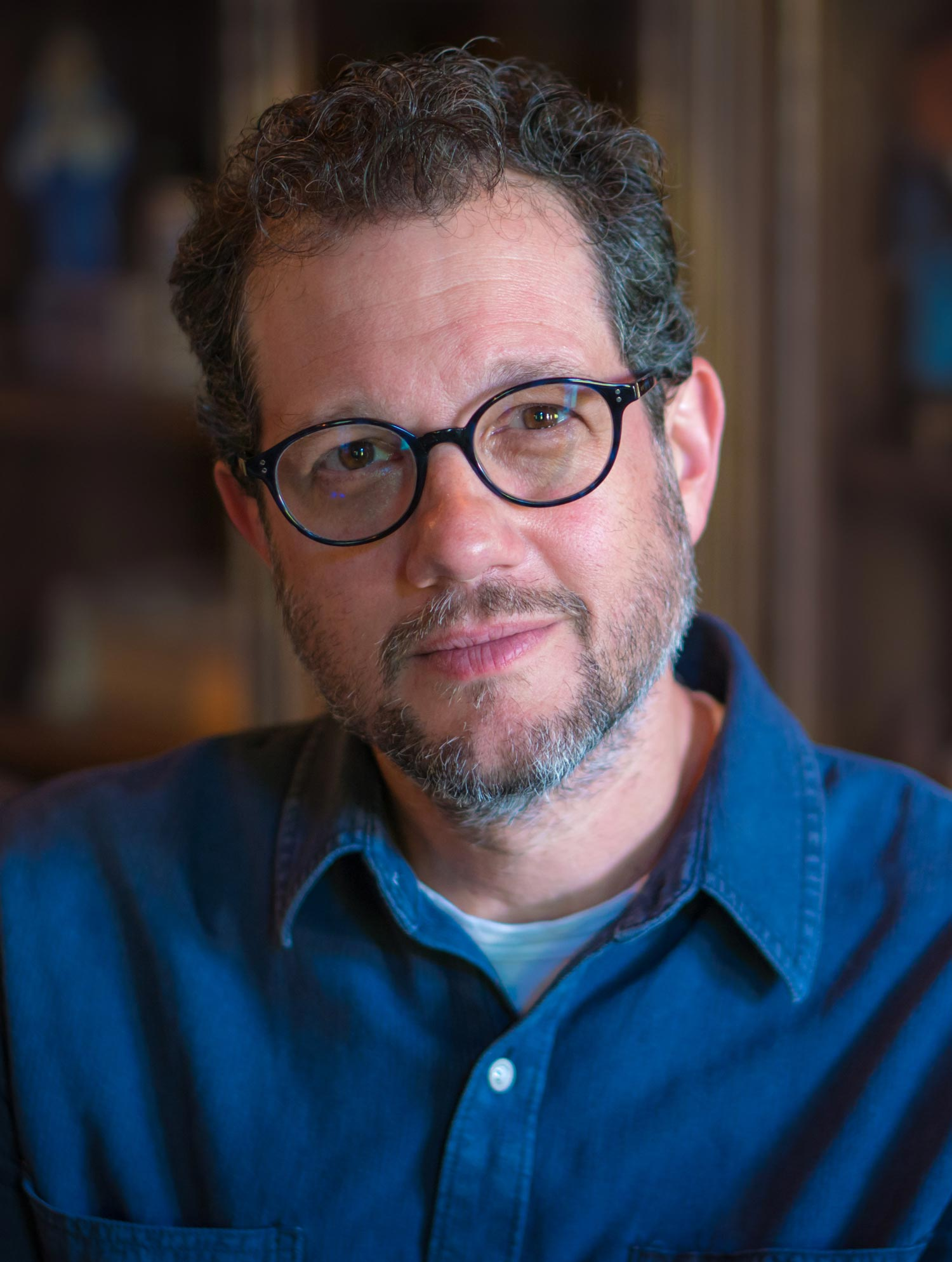
- Giacchino in 2017

Background information
- Born: October 10, 1967 (age 59); Riverside Township, New Jersey, U.S.
- Genres: Film score; contemporary classical; jazz; rock; electronic
- Occupations: Film composer; television director
- Instruments: Piano; keyboards; guitar
- Years active: 1994–present

Michael Giacchino (/dʒəˈkiːnoʊ/ jə-KEE-noh; Italian: [dʒakˈkiːno]; born October 10, 1967) is an American film, television, and video game score composer. He has received numerous accolades for his work, including an Academy Award, a Golden Globe Award, a BAFTA Award, and a Primetime Emmy Award, as well as three Grammy Awards.

Giacchino is known for his collaborations with directors J. J. Abrams, Brad Bird, Matt Reeves, Pete Docter, Colin Trevorrow, Jon Watts, Stevie Wermers-Skelton, Kevin Deters, J. A. Bayona, The Wachowskis, Taika Waititi, Thomas Bezucha, Jared Bush and Byron Howard. His film scores include several films from the Mission: Impossible, Jurassic World, Marvel Cinematic Universe, and Star Trek franchises, eight Pixar Animation Studios films, multiple Disney films, Rogue One, The Batman, and several other films.

Giacchino also composed the score for the video game series Medal of Honor and Call of Duty and the television series Alias, Lost, and Fringe. In 2018, Giacchino ventured into directing, and in 2022, he directed the Marvel Studios Disney+ special Werewolf by Night.

== Early life ==
Giacchino was born in Riverside Township, New Jersey, to an Italian family. His father's ancestors were from Sicily, and his mother's ancestors emigrated from Abruzzo (in southern Italy as well). Giacchino grew up in Edgewater Park Township, New Jersey, and graduated from Holy Cross High School in Delran Township, New Jersey, in 1986. He holds dual American and Italian citizenship. His brother Anthony Giacchino is a documentary filmmaker.

Giacchino began combining images and music at age 10, when he began creating stop-motion animation with homemade soundtracks in his basement. While in high school, an art teacher who mentored Giacchino recommended to his parents that he attend the School of Visual Arts in New York City. Giacchino describes visiting the school with his parents thus:

I thought, wow, this is fantastic. They actually have colleges like this? Where I can do the things that I am really interested in doing? That was amazing to me. I loved SVA. I loved the kind of freedom that it provided. It was kind of like this great experiment—okay, you're here because you like something. So let's see how much you like it. We're not going to regulate you too much. We're going to see how passionate and driven you are, and how much you want this thing.

Giacchino enrolled at SVA, majoring in film production and minoring in history. During his final year at SVA, Giacchino's instructor in film publicity announced an unpaid internship was available at Universal Pictures. Giacchino, who was the only one interested, obtained the six-month position, which he filled at night while attending school during the day and working at Macy's to pay his rent. Giacchino graduated from SVA in 1990 with a Bachelor of Fine Arts, after which he took music classes at the Juilliard School and then at UCLA.

== Career ==
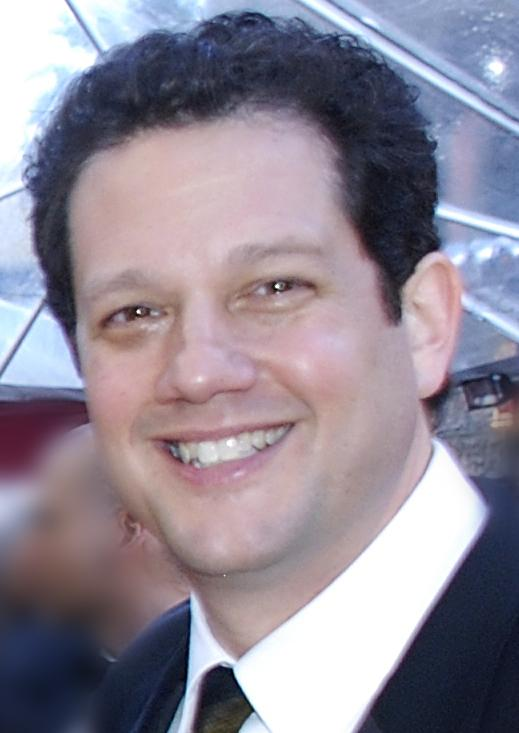
Giacchino in 2010

=== Video games ===
When Giacchino's internship ended, Universal hired him, giving him a job upon graduation from college. Giacchino later moved to Disney, and when Disney relocated to Los Angeles, he moved with them, working in publicity while taking night classes in instrumentation and orchestration at UCLA. Giacchino's work for Disney had him interacting with the various personnel who worked in films, such as the producers who hired composers. When a job at Disney Interactive opened for a producer, Giacchino obtained the job, thinking he could hire himself to write music for the games he produced.

Giacchino's composition work for Disney Interactive during the 16-bit era included the Sega Genesis games Gargoyles and Maui Mallard in Cold Shadow and the various console versions of The Lion King. However, his first major composition was for the DreamWorks video game adaptation of the 1997 movie, The Lost World: Jurassic Park. The video game was one of the first PlayStation (also on Sega Saturn) console titles to be recorded with an original live orchestral score. Giacchino has since continued his relationship with DreamWorks which also included composing the score for the Small Soldiers video game in 1998, providing full orchestral scores for many of their popular videogames. He also worked with Pandemic studios to create the theme for Mercenaries: Playground of Destruction. Giacchino's award-winning compositions cover the first four installments of the Medal of Honor series (Medal of Honor, Underground, Allied Assault and Frontline), Heroes 2, and also the scores for several other World War II-related video games like Secret Weapons Over Normandy, Call of Duty and Call of Duty: Finest Hour. Additionally, Giacchino composed themes for The Incredibles: Rise of the Underminer, and co-wrote the theme of Black with composer Chris Tilton. He also composed the score for Alias, which was based on the television series of the same name. In 2007, he returned to the Medal of Honor franchise as he composed the music for Medal of Honor: Airborne. The following year, Giacchino wrote music for Turning Point: Fall of Liberty.

=== Film and television ===
"Oceanic 815" from Lost (2005)
Sample of brass fall-off from the first season finale of Lost.

Giacchino's work on various video games led to his entrance into television.

In 2001, J. J. Abrams, producer of the television series Alias, discovered Giacchino through his video game work and asked him to provide the new show's soundtrack. The soundtrack featured a mix of full orchestral pieces frequently intermingled with upbeat electronic music, a departure from much of his previous work. Giacchino would go on to provide the score for Abrams' 2004 television series Lost, creating an acclaimed score which employed a unique process of using spare pieces of a plane fuselage for percussion parts. The score for Lost is also notable for a signature thematic motif: a brass fall-off at the end of certain themes. Just like his counterpart, Stu Phillips, he worked with the television show creator Abrams on his shows with his music scores while Abrams supplied the show's main themes on certain series such as Alias.

In 2004, Giacchino received his first big feature film commission. Brad Bird, director of Pixar's The Incredibles, asked Giacchino to provide the soundtrack for the film after having heard his work on Alias. The upbeat jazz orchestral sound was a departure in style not only for Giacchino but for Pixar, which had previously relied on Randy and Thomas Newman for all of its films. Director Brad Bird had originally sought out John Barry – perhaps best known for his work on the early James Bond films—but Barry was disinclined to repeat the styles of his earlier works.

Giacchino was nominated for two Grammy Awards in 2005 for The Incredibles: Best Score Soundtrack Album for Motion Picture, Television or Other Visual Media and Best Instrumental Composition.

Like his other counterparts, Joel McNeely, J. A. C. Redford and Frank DeVol, Giacchino mostly associated with Disney from early in his career up to most recently, ranging from video games such as Mickey Mania and Gargoyles to films such as The Incredibles and eventually collaborated with Walt Disney Imagineering in creating two new soundtracks for the updated versions of Space Mountain at Disneyland, Space Mountain: Mission 2 at Disneyland Paris, and Space Mountain at Hong Kong Disneyland.

Giacchino composed scores for the 2005 films Sky High and The Family Stone, and the television movie The Muppets' Wizard of Oz. Additionally, he wrote the music for Joseph Barbera's final theatrical Tom and Jerry cartoon The Karate Guard, and scored the Abrams-directed 2006 film Mission: Impossible III. Giacchino's next musical achievement was his Paris-inspired score for the Disney-Pixar film Ratatouille, which includes the theme song "Le Festin", performed by French artist Camille. He received his first Academy Award nomination for this score. He also created the score for Abrams' 2009 Star Trek film.

Giacchino scored the Pixar film Up (and its accompanying animated short Partly Cloudy), for which he collaborated with director Pete Docter. This marked the first time Giacchino worked with a Pixar director other than Brad Bird. This work gained Giacchino his first Academy Award for Best Original Score: the first-ever win for Pixar in that category. Giacchino notes that he won on the same night as his SVA classmate Joel Harlow won the Best Makeup Oscar for Star Trek.

Giacchino has continued his collaboration with J. J. Abrams. For the Abrams-produced monster film Cloverfield, he wrote an homage to Japanese monster scores in an overture titled "ROAR!", which played over the credits, and constituted the only original music for the film. Giacchino composed the score for J. J. Abrams' feature Super 8 in 2011. He also composed for the pilot of the Abrams-produced American television series Fringe, after which Giacchino gave scoring duties to his assistant Chad Seiter, who scored the first half of season one. The task was then passed on to Chris Tilton, who scored the latter half of season one and all subsequent seasons.

In 2016, Giacchino composed the score for the Marvel film Doctor Strange, as well as the score for the Disney film Zootopia. He also composed the fanfare for the new Marvel Studios logo, which debuted with Doctor Strange. In September 2016, it was announced that Giacchino had been chosen to replace composer Alexandre Desplat as the composer for the Star Wars anthology film Rogue One after Desplat was unavailable following reshoots. Giacchino then scored four more Marvel films: 2017's Spider-Man: Homecoming, 2019's Spider-Man: Far From Home, 2021's Spider-Man: No Way Home, and 2022's Thor: Love and Thunder.

Giacchino returned to Pixar to score Coco (2017) and Incredibles 2 (2018). He also composed the score for Taika Waititi's 2019 film Jojo Rabbit. In 2022, Giacchino composed the score for The Batman, and the score for the Pixar film Lightyear.

In 2018, Giacchino wrote, directed, and scored Monster Challenge. The short film is a satirical take on Japanese game shows, starring Patton Oswalt, Ben Schwartz, Dermot Mulroney, Amy Brenneman, Benedict Wong, Tom Everett Scott, Taishi Mizuno, Ann Madox, and Teruko Nakajima. Monster Challenge originally premiered at Fantastic Fest in 2018 and premiered on YouTube on March 20, 2020. He continued with his directorial efforts with a Star Trek: Short Treks episode "Ephraim and Dot" in 2019.

On March 7, 2022, Variety reported that Giacchino was directing an upcoming as-of-yet untitled Marvel Studios television project for Disney+. Four days later, The Hollywood Reporter revealed that he would be directing Werewolf by Night, which was released on October 7, 2022.

=== Additional compositions ===
In 2005, Giacchino collaborated with Walt Disney Imagineering in creating two new soundtracks for the updated versions of Space Mountain at Disneyland, Space Mountain: Mission 2 at Disneyland Paris, and Space Mountain at Hong Kong Disneyland. He was also contracted by Sarah Vowell, who played character Violet in The Incredibles, to compose the score to the audio version of her book Assassination Vacation. Giacchino's music can also be heard in "Star Tours: The Adventure Continues" during the "travel log videos" shown in the queue for both the Disneyland and Walt Disney World versions of the attraction.

In 2009, Giacchino was asked to conduct the Academy Awards orchestra for the 81st Academy Awards. For this project, he rearranged many famous movie themes in different styles, including a 1930s Big Band treatment of Lawrence of Arabia and a bossa nova of Moon River. Giacchino also composed the fanfare for the 100th Anniversary logo of Paramount Pictures, which debuted with Mission: Impossible – Ghost Protocol on December 7, 2011, at the Dubai International Film Festival, which it carried onto the logos of Paramount's other divisions, as well as the new fanfare for Marvel Studios, which debuted alongside its logo with Doctor Strange on October 13, 2016, in Hong Kong, in which he also composed an arrangement of the theme song of the 1967 Spider-Man cartoon series, in Spider-Man: Homecoming, replacing his work on the fanfare of the Marvel Studios logo for that film, and he rearranged the fanfare in Thor: Love and Thunder to make a more rock style, and Werewolf by Night, in which he directed the special. On top of that, he also composed the fanfare for the Marvel Studios Special Presentation and Marvel Spotlight logos, which debuted in Werewolf by Night and Echo, respectively.

=== Acting ===
In 2015, Giacchino played an It's a Small World operator in the film Tomorrowland, which he scored. That same year, he played First Order Stormtrooper FN-3181 in J. J. Abrams' Star Wars: The Force Awakens. Giacchino reprised the role in the 2018 animated film Ralph Breaks the Internet. In 2019, he cameoed as a Sith trooper in Star Wars: The Rise of Skywalker, also directed by Abrams.

=== Directing ===
Giacchino grew up with an immense love for filmmaking, often spending time making short films in his youth. Giacchino made his professional directorial debut in 2019 with an episode of Star Trek: Short Treks during its second season. In 2020, Giacchino directed in his own short film, Monster Challenge, starring Patton Oswalt. Two years later, Giacchino directed and scored the Marvel Studios Halloween special Werewolf by Night to critical acclaim. In January 2023, it was announced that Giacchino would make his feature directorial debut with a remake of the 1954 science fiction classic Them! for Warner Bros. Pictures. He is expected to score the film as well. In April 2025, Warners CEOs Michael De Luca and Pam Abdy updated that Matt Reeves would be producing the film.

== Style ==
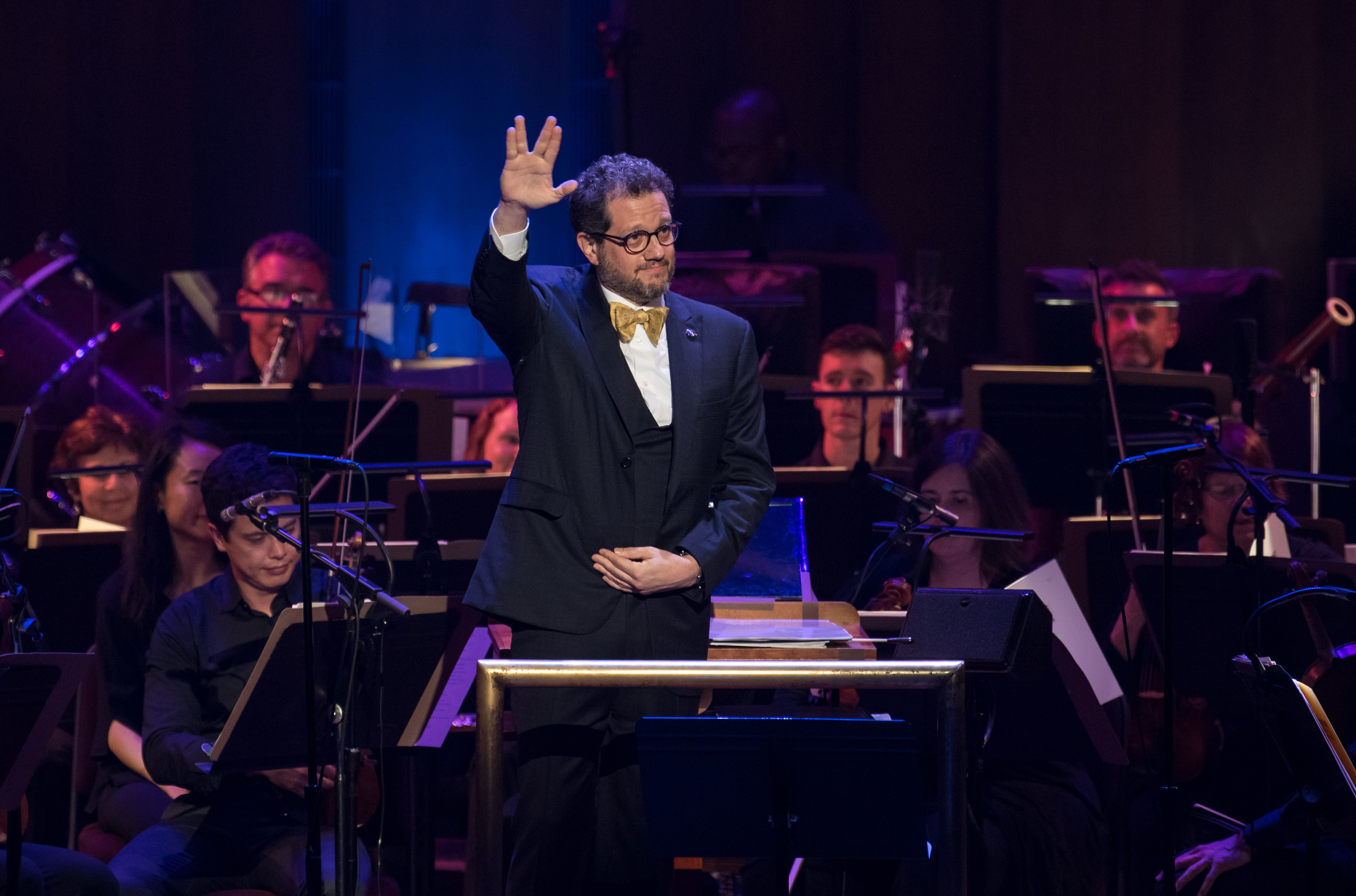
Giacchino in 2018

Giacchino is noted for using humorous titles filled with puns on his soundtrack albums. Dawn of the Planet of the Apes and Jurassic World in particular had many ape- and dinosaur-related double entendres such as "Gorilla Warfare" and "Raptor Your Heart Out". Many of those have references to previous works of his, both in style and naming. Giacchino used themes from the track "U-Boat" from the Medal of Honor soundtrack in the tracks "Sawyer Jones and the Temple of Boom" and "Sub-Primed" from the 5th and 6th season Lost soundtracks as the submarine motif. In terms of naming, the score for The Incredibles contains a piece named "100 Mile Dash", and subsequently Ratatouille had "100 Rat Dash", Up had "Three Dog Dash", and Coco had "Shrine and Dash". Over a dozen of his scores have a track called "World's Worst X"; such as "World's Worst Beach Party" from the first Lost album, and "World's Worst Parking Valet" from Mission: Impossible – Ghost Protocol.

Notably - this tradition of pun names was omitted from the soundtrack of Society of the Snow, likely out of respect for the victims of the disaster.

== Filmography ==
=== Television (as director) ===
Title	Year	Notes
Monster Challenge	2018	Short film
Star Trek: Short Treks	2019	Episode: "Ephraim and Dot"
Werewolf by Night	2022	Disney+ television special also composer

== Personal life ==
Giacchino's son, Mick, is also a composer.

== See also ==
- Music of Lost
- Music of Star Wars
- Music of Star Trek
- Music of the Marvel Cinematic Universe
- Music of Batman
