= Les Mystères du Nautilus =

Disneyland Paris attraction

Coordinates: 48°52′24.46″N 2°46′46.42″E

Disneyland Park (Paris)
- Area: Discoveryland
- Status: Operating
- Opening date: July 4, 1994

Ride statistics
- Designer: Walt Disney Imagineering
- Theme: 20,000 Leagues Under the Sea
- Audio-Animatronics: 1
- Wheelchair accessible

Les Mystères du Nautilus (French for "The Mysteries of the Nautilus") is a walkthrough attraction at Disneyland Paris in France. It is an updated version of the 20,000 Leagues Under the Sea walkthrough attraction that was at Disneyland in Anaheim, CA in the early 1950s, based upon the film of the same name. This attraction takes guests throughout the various rooms of Captain Nemo's submarine, especially those seen in the film. It opened on 4 July 1994.

== Summary ==
The submarine is located in a lagoon near Star Wars Hyperspace Mountain. Guests enter what looks like a lighthouse, and proceed into the attraction through an underwater corridor. Although guests may believe they are visiting the submarine seen in the lagoon, the 'underwater tunnel' leads them into a show building hidden by tall green bushes. The winding staircase into the attraction helps to disorient guests so they do not realise this.

Six rooms are visited inside the Nautilus:

- The Ballasts Compartment: This is a dimly lit room, with an open safe at the center. Inside the safe is the treasure Captain Nemo has gathered from his many underwater explorations. Ned Land's guitar from the movie used to sit amongst the coins but has since been removed.
- Captain Nemo's Cabin: This cabin, complete with a bed and wash area, allows guests to have a look at the Captain's belongings and his collection of books, paintings and other artefacts.
- The Charts Room: This room is the hub of the Nautilus, with staircases ascending to the wheelhouse and the main deck above (although these cannot be visited). Several charts are displayed, including one representing Vulcania Island, Nemo's lair in the movie.
- The Diving Chamber: In the center of this small chamber is a hatch which produces bubbles and leads to the bottom of the ocean underneath. Diving suits stand along the wall.
- The Salon: This is the heart of the Nautilus. Books, artifacts, and numerous treasures of the sea are gathered here. The pipe organ stands on the far side and guests used to see Nemo's reflection when staring at the mirror just above the keyboard. A window opens onto the ocean's depths and allows guests to witness the ocean depths. It formerly featured an attack by a giant squid. As it approaches, one can see its beak reach for the submarine. The creature is later repulsed by an electric zap. This squid was an animatronic in a dark room that gave the illusion of being underwater. The flooded double-glass window with air bubbles, together with water-ripple lights projected onto the squid, created a realistic effect. When the attraction reopened on July 1, 2023 after a lengthy refurbishment, the giant squid animatronic and attack scene was removed and replaced by scenes showing dolphins, hammerhead sharks, humpback whales, and sea turtles using screens. Captain Nemo's reflection in the organ's mirror was also removed.
- The Engine Room: The last room to be visited. Machines and engines powering the propeller can be found here, along with the power unit on the opposite wall. The scene also showcases steam effects and lighting.

== Design ==
In its concept stage, a larger version of this walkthrough was intended, with a greater number of rooms to visit and even dine in an underwater restaurant located within the Salon. It was to be part of the never-built Discovery Mountain project, which was shelved and scaled back to Space Mountain when the costs to design and build became too high.

The squid attack was more elaborate when the attraction first opened in 1994. It began with the organ playing Johann Sebastian Bach'sToccata & Fugue in D Minor, and Captain Nemo giving a short speech about his ocean kingdom. Then, the window opened for guests to witness the ocean depths, until a giant tentacle hit the glass. Captain Nemo ordered the window to close, and tried to free the submarine from the squid's grip. Yet, bursts of water from the ceiling reached the audience, and the engines eventually broke down. Finally, as the window reopened, guests could see the whole monster. Electric zaps struck it, but it would not unleash the submarine until the zaps were more powerful. Due to a number of technical problems, this scene was shortened.

Disney Imagineer Tom Sherman designed the attraction and created many concept sketches and models. He ultimately oversaw the construction of it, and was awarded the name of "Admiral of the Nautilus" before opening. Fellow imagineer Tim Delaney, whom worked on Discoveryland, stated it was, for him, "a dream come true."

== See also ==
- Jules Verne
- Twenty Thousand Leagues Under the Seas, 1870 novel
- 20,000 Leagues Under the Sea, 1954 film
- The Nautilus
- Captain Nemo
- Discoveryland
- Space Mountain
