= 20,000 Leagues Under the Sea (1954 film) =

1954 film by Richard Fleischer

- Theatrical release poster
- Directed by: Richard Fleischer
- Screenplay by: Earl Felton
- Based on: Twenty Thousand Leagues Under the Seas by Jules Verne
- Produced by: Walt Disney
- Starring: Kirk Douglas; James Mason; Paul Lukas; Peter Lorre
- Cinematography: Franz Planer
- Edited by: Elmo Williams
- Music by: Paul Smith
- Production company: Walt Disney Productions
- Distributed by: Buena Vista Distribution
- Release date: December 23, 1954
- Running time: 127 minutes
- Country: United States
- Language: English
- Budget: $5 million
- Box office: $28.2 million

20,000 Leagues Under the Sea is a 1954 American science fiction adventure film from Walt Disney Productions. Adapted from Jules Verne's 1870 novel Twenty Thousand Leagues Under the Seas, the film was directed by Richard Fleischer, from a screenplay by Earl Felton. It stars Kirk Douglas, James Mason, Paul Lukas, and Peter Lorre. Photographed in Technicolor, the film was one of the first feature-length motion pictures to be filmed in CinemaScope. It was Disney's first feature film to be distributed by Buena Vista Distribution.

Upon its premiere on December 23, 1954, 20,000 Leagues Under the Sea was a critical and commercial success, with particular praise going towards Mason's performance as Captain Nemo. At the 27th Academy Awards, the film received three nominations, winning two—Best Art Direction and Best Special Effects.

== Plot ==
In 1868, rumors spread of a sea monster attacking many ships in the Pacific Ocean. Professor Pierre Aronnax and his assistant, Conseil, are asked to investigate the scene. They board a U.S. Navy frigate with Ned Land, a master harpooner.

After months of patrolling, the monster is spotted. The frigate's crew opens fire, but the monster rams the ship. Ned, Conseil, and Aronnax are thrown overboard, while the disabled frigate drifts away. While clinging to wreckage, Aronnax and Conseil come upon a metal vessel, realizing that the monster is a man-made "submerging boat", which appears deserted. Below deck, Aronnax finds a large viewport and witnesses an underwater funeral, while Ned arrives on an overturned longboat from their ship.

Spotted by the divers, Ned, Aronnax, and Conseil attempt to leave in the longboat, but they are captured. The vessel's captain introduces himself as Captain Nemo, master of the Nautilus. He returns Ned and Conseil to the deck while offering Aronnax the chance to stay. After Aronnax proves willing to die with his companions as the ship submerges, Nemo allows Ned and Conseil to remain aboard. He explains that he has intentionally withdrawn from civilization, and that the sea provides all he needs. Arronax is amazed by Nemo's discoveries and inventions, including the advanced technology of the Nautilus and the crew's ability to harvest an abundance of sea creatures for food.

The Nautilus arrives at a penal colony island, where the prisoners are loading a munitions ship. Nemo, who was once a prisoner there, rams the ship and destroys it. Nemo tells Aronnax that he has just saved thousands from death in war, and that "this hated nation" tortured his wife and son to death while attempting to force him to reveal his discoveries. In Nemo's cabin, Ned and Conseil discover the coordinates of Nemo's secret island base called Vulcania, where the Nautilus is now heading. Hoping to be rescued, Ned loads bottles with the coordinates and throws them overboard.

Off the coast of New Guinea, the Nautilus becomes stranded on a reef. Nemo allows Ned to go ashore with Conseil, ostensibly to collect specimens, while admonishing them to stay on the beach. Ned instead goes exploring for avenues of escape, and finds human skulls posted on stakes. Ned runs back to Conseil, and they row away pursued by the cannibals. Aboard the Nautilus, the cannibals are repelled by electrical charges sent through its hull, and Nemo confines Ned for disobeying orders.

A warship fires upon the Nautilus, which descends into the depths, attracting a giant squid. After an electric charge fails to repel the creature, Nemo and his men surface to fight it off. Nemo is caught by one of its tentacles, and Ned, having escaped from captivity, fatally harpoons it. He then saves Nemo, who had been pulled into the sea. Having had a change of heart, Nemo decides to make amends with human civilization.

The Nautilus enters Vulcania through an underwater passage to avoid the warships that now surround it. Nemo rushes ashore to activate a time bomb, which will destroy all evidence of his discoveries, but he is shot and mortally wounded as he returns onboard. Nemo announces that he will be sinking with the ship, and the crew agrees to accompany him.

Aronnax, Conseil, and Ned are confined to their cabins. Refusing to be part of the suicide pact, Ned escapes and brings the submarine to the surface. The Nautilus strikes a reef and begins to flood. Nemo dies while viewing his beloved undersea domain through the hull's viewport.

Aronnax tries to retrieve his journal, but the urgency of their escape obliges Ned to knock him unconscious and carry him out. Aboard a skiff, the three companions witness Vulcania explode. As the Nautilus sinks, Nemo's last words to Aronnax echo: "There is hope for the future. And when the world is ready for a new and better life, all this will someday come to pass ... in God's good time."

== Cast ==
Dinner aboard the Nautilus. From left to right: James Mason, Kirk Douglas, Peter Lorre, and Paul Lukas.

- Kirk Douglas as Ned Land
- James Mason as Captain Nemo
- Paul Lukas as Professor Pierre Aronnax
- Peter Lorre as Conseil
- Robert J. Wilke as Nautilus's First Mate
- Ted de Corsia as Captain Farragut
- Carleton Young as John Howard
- J. M. Kerrigan as Billy
- Percy Helton as Coach driver
- Ted Cooper as Abraham Lincoln's First Mate
- Fred Graham as Casey (uncredited stuntman)
- Laurie Mitchell as Hooker (uncredited debut)

== Production ==
Walt Disney first expressed interest in an adaptation of Jules Verne's Twenty Thousand Leagues Under the Seas after seeing some marine footage and storyboards created by Harper Goff during the production of the True-Life Adventures series. At the time, the film rights were owned by Metro-Goldwyn-Mayer and King Brothers Productions. The film was originally conceived as an animated feature. In November 1950, film producer Sid Rogell acquired the screen rights to the novel, and a film adaptation prepared by Robert L. Lippert's production company. He had planned to start filming within a year at the General Service Studios. In December 1951, Disney purchased the film rights from Rogell. Goff's storyboards and art designs formed the film's basis.

20,000 Leagues Under the Sea was filmed at locations in The Bahamas and Jamaica, with the cave scenes filmed beneath what is now the Xtabi Resort on the cliffs of Negril. Other scenes were photographed in Nassau, Lyford Cay, where the 1916 version was filmed, and Death Valley. Filming took place between January 11 and June 19, 1954. The scenes in San Francisco at the beginning were filmed at Universal Studios while most of the modeling shots were done at 20th Century Fox. (Note: Footage of the original, rejected giant squid attack sequence shows details of the filming.)

Some of the location filming sequences were so complex that they required a technical crew of more than 400 people. The production presented many other challenges. The famous giant squid attack sequence had to be entirely re-shot, as it was originally filmed as taking place at dusk and in a calm sea. (Note: Footage of the original, rejected giant squid attack sequence shows details of the filming.) The sequence was filmed again, this time taking place at night and during a humongous thunderstorm, both to increase the drama and to better hide the cables and other mechanical workings of the animatronic squid.

The film's total production cost has been reported as $5 million and $9 million respectively but, either way, 20,000 Leagues Under the Sea was the most expensive and ambitious feature film production mounted by Disney up to that time.

=== Differences between novel and film ===
The film was praised as faithfully adapting the novel. James W. Maertens writes that while this is true, "Close comparison of the novel and film reveals many changes, omissions, even reversals, which affect the story's fundamental concern (besides scientific education), a representation of class and gender, specifically masculinity, in the industrial age." Originally battery-powered in the novel, Captain Nemo (James Mason)'s submarine the Nautilus, is powered by atomic energy in the film. The novel's submarine is also a "streamlined, cigar shaped sub" while the film's is "a more ornate vessel".

The film's director and screenwriter extracted "the most memorable scenes from the novel and freely reordered them under the assumption that viewers would not remember the novel's order of events." Goff and Disney based the Nautilus's design in the film on the interior of the Forth Bridge. In the novel, Nemo orders parts from various industries, secretly shipping them to an island for assembly, whom Maertens labeled "a logistical genius at manipulating Industrial Age manufacturing".

== Music ==
Rather than an authentic soundtrack recording of the film's score or dialogue, two vinyl studio cast record albums were released to coincide with the film's first two releases in 1954 and 1963. Both albums contained condensed and heavily altered versions of the film's script, without the usage of any of the film's cast for character voices. Both albums were narrated by Ned Land as opposed to Pierre Aronnax, who narrated the film and the original novel.

Neither album mentioned Nemo as actually being "cracked" (i.e. insane), as the film does, and considerably sanitized the character by omitting any mention of him killing anyone. The albums had Nemo surviving at the end and releasing Ned, Arronax, and Conseil out of gratitude for their saving his life. In this version, Ned, Aronnax and Conseil were not shipwrecked because the Nautilus rammed the ship they were on, but because a hurricane came up.

The first album was issued in 1954 in conjunction with the film's original release, and starred William Redfield as the voice of Ned. This album, a book-and-record set, was issued as part of RCA Victor's Little Nipper series on two 45-RPM records.

A single for the film's most memorable song "A Whale of a Tale", written by Norman Gimbel and Al Hoffman and sung by Kirk Douglas, was released in 1954 under the Decca Children's Series label. According to Douglas, the recording was "very popular at the time". The song "And the Moon Grew Brighter and Brighter", which Douglas had sung in the movie Man Without a Star, written by Lou Singer and Jimmy Kennedy, was the B-side. Both songs can be found on the 2008 digital release of the film's soundtrack. Douglas also performed the song on The Ed Sullivan Show on December 5, 1954.

In the film, Johann Sebastian Bach's Toccata and Fugue in D minor is played by Nemo on the Nautilus's organ, but James Mason's playing is actually dubbed by an anonymous organist.

=== Official soundtrack ===
In January 2008, Walt Disney Records released a 26-track digital album containing the music of Paul Smith's original soundtrack score to 20,000 Leagues Under the Sea, plus both sides of the "A Whale of a Tale" single, and a digital booklet companion that explores the music of the film. This was the first official release of the film score and was initially available only through the iTunes Store. Intrada released the same soundtrack on CD in 2011. The music for 20,000 Leagues Under the Sea was composed by Paul Smith, with Joseph Dubin acting as the orchestrator.

== Release ==
On September 15, 1954, Variety reported that Disney and RKO Pictures had begun discussions on the distribution plans for 20,000 Leagues Under the Sea. A week later, it was reported that Disney decided to end his 17-year association with RKO, choosing instead to release the film through his newly formed distribution arm, Buena Vista Distribution. Overseas, the film was distributed by Walt Disney British Films Ltd, a studio-owned subsidiary in the UK, and other local distributors in international territories.

On December 23, 1954, the film premiered at the Astor Theatre. It was released in 65 key cities across the United States two days later, on Christmas Day. The film was re-released in theaters in 1963 and 1971.

=== Home media ===
In September 1980, 20,000 Leagues Under the Sea was made available for purchase or rental on videocassette, among other Disney films. In 1992, Scott MacQueen, then-senior manager of Disney's library restoration, did an extensive digital restoration for the film's videocassette release.

In May 2003, the film was released on a two-disc DVD set with supplemental features, including an audio commentary, deleted scenes (including the original squid fight albeit without sound), and an extensive making-of documentary. On the same day, the film was screened at the El Capitan Theatre, with Richard Fleischer introducing the film. A 1080p HD version from a 4K restoration was released on iTunes in 2014. In 2019, the film was released on Blu-ray via the Disney Movie Club. The film was made available to stream on Disney+ when the service launched in November 2019.

== Reception ==
=== Box office ===
During its opening weekend, 20,000 Leagues Under the Sea opened in second place at the box office behind There's No Business Like Show Business (1954). On its third weekend, the film became the number-one box office film in the United States, displacing Vera Cruz (1954). It was dethroned by Vera Cruz on its fourth weekend, but the film reclaimed the number-one position on its fifth weekend. By January 1956, the film had earned $8 million in distributor rentals at the box office from the United States and Canada, becoming the third highest-grossing film of 1954. Another account put its initial rentals in the US and Canada at $6,607,000.

=== Critical reaction ===
Bosley Crowther of The New York Times stated that, "As fabulous and fantastic as anything he has ever done in cartoons is Walt Disney's 'live action' movie made from Jules Verne's 20,000 Leagues Under the Sea. Turned out in CinemaScope and color, it is as broad, fictitiously, as it is long (128 minutes), and should prove a sensation—at least with the kids."

Pauline Kael wondered if the film would have been such a success had Kirk Douglas not been there to "destroy the illusion of the nineteenth century".

Gene Arneel of Variety praised the film as "a special kind of picture making, combining photographic ingenuity, imaginative story telling and fiscal daring". He felt "Richard Fleischer's direction keeps the Disney epic moving at a smart clip, picking up interest right from the start and deftly developing each of the many tense moments ... Earl Felton's screenplay looks to be a combination of the best in the Verne original and new material to suit the screen form. It's a fine job of writing stimulating pic fare. Technical credits — underline the water photography — are excellent."

Kate Cameron of the New York Daily News praised the film as a "thrilling and absorbing adaptation"; she further wrote: "Richard Fleischer handled the direction of the film with vivid imagination. The underwater scenes are fascinating in their eerie beauty and the interesting glimpses they contain of marine life."

Philip K. Scheuer, reviewing for the Los Angeles Times, wrote: "Technically the film is a marvel itself, with actual underwater shot made in the Bahamas alternating with surface scale models that defy detection as such." He also praised Mason's performance, claiming "he lends depth and dimension to the stock figure of the 'mad genius.' The proof: he sometimes seems more pitied than scorned." Harrison's Reports wrote: "Expertly utilizing the CinemaScope medium and Technicolor photography, he [Walt Disney] and his staff have fashioned a picture that is not only a masterpiece from the production point of view but also a great entertainment, the kind that should go over in a big way with all types of audiences." A review in the Chicago Tribune wrote, "Produced with care, in handsome color and peppered with humor, it's a nicely balanced dose of old supposition and modern fact."

Contemporary film critic Steve Biodrowski said that the film is "far superior to the majority of genre efforts from the period (or any period, for that matter), with production design and technical effects that have dated hardly at all." Biodrowski also added that the film "may occasionally succumb to some of the problems inherent in the source material (the episodic nature does slow the pace), but the strengths far outweigh the weaknesses, making this one of the greatest science-fiction films ever made."

One reviewer gave the film five out of five, praising the film for its "story, dialogue, acting and overall bonhomie". Mark Bourne praised "its elaborate special effects and art direction, the faultless performances (especially Mason's), and unbeatable deep-sea adventure storytelling" However, he thought the portrayals of the natives to be "stereotypical". Jason Seiver praised the film's story, setting, and visuals but criticized the humor.

On the review aggregator website Rotten Tomatoes, the film has an approval rating of 91% based on 32 reviews, with an average rating of 7.70/10. The website's critical consensus reads: "One of Disney's finest live-action adventures, 20,000 Leagues Under the Sea brings Jules Verne's classic sci-fi tale to vivid life, and features an awesome giant squid."

=== Accolades ===
Award	Category	Recipients	Result
27th Academy Awards	Best Art Direction – Color	John Meehan, Emile Kuri	Won
27th Academy Awards	Best Special Effects	John Hench, Joshua Meador	Won
27th Academy Awards	Best Film Editing	Elmo Williams	Nominated
National Board of Review Awards 1954	Top Ten Films	20,000 Leagues Under the Sea	Won
Saturn Awards	Best DVD Classic Film Release		Nominated
Online Film & Television Association Awards	Hall of Fame – Motion Picture		Inducted

The film's primary art director Harper Goff, who designed the fictitious Nautilus submarine, was not a member of the Art Directors Union. Therefore, under a bylaw within the Academy of Motion Pictures, he was unable to receive his Academy Award for Art Direction.

== Legacy ==
=== In Disney resorts ===
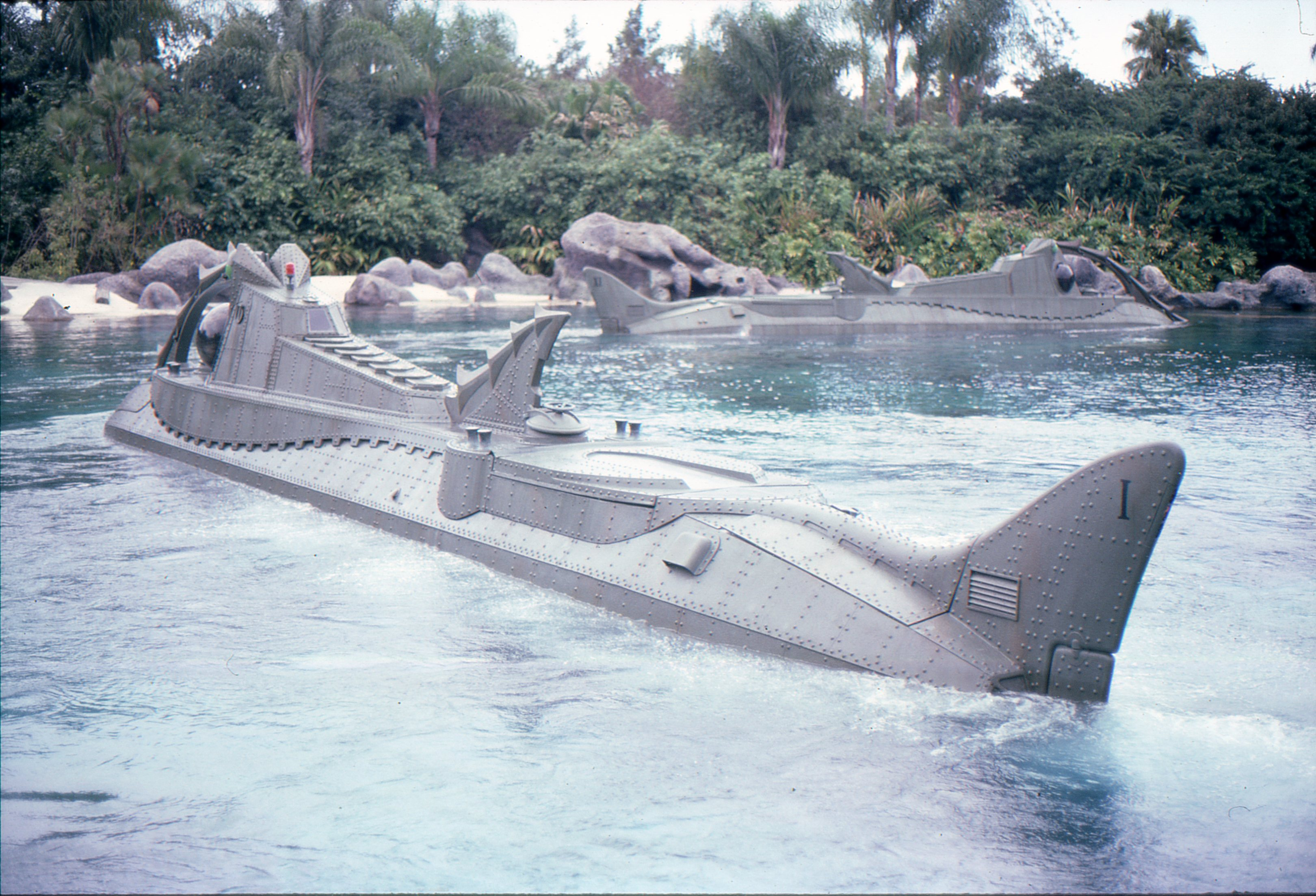
The 20,000 Leagues Under the Sea: Submarine Voyage at Walt Disney World in 1979

Disneyland used the original sets as a walk-through attraction from 1955 to 1966. Walt Disney World Resort's Magic Kingdom also had a dark ride named 20,000 Leagues Under the Sea: Submarine Voyage from 1971 to 1994 which consisted of a submarine ride, complete with the giant squid attack, and an arrangement of the main theme from the 1954 film playing on Captain Nemo's organ in the background. For this ride, voice artist Peter Renaday stood in for James Mason in the role of Captain Nemo.

In 1994, a walkthrough attraction opened at Disneyland Paris, named Les Mystères du Nautilus. In 2001, a dark ride was created at Tokyo DisneySea. The exterior to The Little Mermaid: Ariel's Undersea Adventure contains a silhouette of the Nautilus in a rock wall. The tiki bar Trader Sam's Grog Grotto at Disney's Polynesian Village Resort serves a cocktail called the "Nautilus" which is served in a stylized drinking vessel resembling the submarine, and features a dive helmet and a mechanical squid tentacle that pours liquor behind the bar.

=== Comic book adaptation ===
- Dell Four Color #614 (February 1955)

=== Remake and prequel ===
In January 2009, Variety reported that a live-action remake titled 20,000 Leagues Under the Sea: Captain Nemo was being planned with McG attached to direct. The film served as an origin story for Captain Nemo, as he builds his warship, the Nautilus. McG had remarked that it would be "much more in keeping with the spirit of the novel" than Richard Fleischer's film, in which it would reveal "what Aronnax is up to and the becoming of Captain Nemo, and how the man became at war with war itself". It was written by Bill Marsilli, with Justin Marks and Randall Wallace brought in to do rewrites. The film was to be produced by Sean Bailey with McG's Wonderland Sound and Vision.

McG once suggested that he wanted Will Smith as Captain Nemo, but he reportedly turned down the part. As a second possible choice, McG had mentioned Sam Worthington, with whom he worked on Terminator Salvation (2009), though they did not hold serious discussions. In November 2009, the project was shelved by then-Walt Disney Pictures chairman Rich Ross, after $10 million had been spent on pre-production work. Prior to the announcement, McG and Bailey had been notified of the project's cancellation.

During the 2010 San Diego Comic-Con, director David Fincher announced plans of directing 20,000 Leagues Under the Sea for Walt Disney Pictures based on a script by Scott Z. Burns. While Fincher was wrapping up The Girl with the Dragon Tattoo (2011), it was speculated that 20,000 Leagues Under the Sea would enter principal photography by late 2012. In the meantime, Fincher began courting Brad Pitt to play the role of Ned Land while the film was kept on hold. In February 2013, it was announced that Pitt had officially turned down the role.

In April 2013, the Australian government provided a one-off incentive of $20 million in order to secure the production. Despite this, the film was put on hold again the following month due to complications in casting a lead. In July 2013, Fincher dropped out to direct the film adaptation of Gone Girl. Fincher revealed in an interview that he left the film because he wanted Channing Tatum for Ned Land, but Disney wanted Chris Hemsworth for the role. The money originally allocated for the production of this film was redirected towards Pirates of the Caribbean: Dead Men Tell No Tales (2017).

In February 2016, Disney announced that it was planning a live-action film titled Captain Nemo, with James Mangold directing. Mangold left the project to instead direct Indiana Jones and the Dial of Destiny (2023).

In August 2021, it was announced that a ten-episode miniseries titled Nautilus was in development. The series will be an origin story about Captain Nemo and will be written by James Dormer, who will co-produce with Johanna Devereaux. In November 2021, Shazad Latif was cast in the lead role while Michael Matthews will direct the series. In August 2023, Disney pulled out from the project due to its cost-reduction strategy to its streaming platforms. In October 2023, the AMC television channel acquired the series and began airing it on June 29, 2025.

== See also ==
- List of underwater science fiction works
- Mysterious Island, a 1961 film by Columbia Pictures, based on Verne's 1874 novel The Mysterious Island, which was a sequel to two of Verne's earlier novels: In Search of the Castaways (also known as Captain Grant's Children) (1867) and Twenty Thousand Leagues Under the Seas (1870)
- In Search of the Castaways, a 1962 Disney film based on Verne's 1867 novel In Search of the Castaways (a.k.a. Captain Grant's Children)
- Atlantis: The Lost Empire, a 2001 Disney animated film that would share much of the same design language as 20,000 Leagues Under the Sea

== Bibliography ==
- Douglas, Kirk (1989). The Ragman's Son: An Autobiography. New York: Pocket Books. ISBN 0-671-63718-5.
- Schickel, Richard (1997) [1968]. The Disney Version: The Life, Times, Art and Commerce of Walt Disney (Third ed.). Chicago: Ivan R. Dee. ISBN 978-1-56663-158-7.
- Warren, Bill (2009) [1982]. Keep Watching the Skies: American Science Fiction Films of the Fifties (21st Century ed.). Jefferson, North Carolina: McFarland & Company. ISBN 978-0-89950-032-4.
