= Little Nipper =

The Little Nipper series was an RCA Victor series of records aimed at children first issued in 1944 on 78 RPM, and then on 45 RPM in the 1950s. In the 1950s, Little Nipper was especially used for "extended play" albums featuring only four or five songs. The Disney Studio released several short albums derived from their hit films, both musical and dramatic, on the "Little Nipper" series. These were two-record albums accompanied by a booklet slipcover featuring the spoken text of the album so that the young listener could follow along.

Sometimes several selections from a Broadway cast album would be featured on Little Nipper albums, especially one which children would enjoy. One of these featured four songs from the cast album of Peter Pan, starring Mary Martin.

"Nipper" was the name of the dog whose picture was shown with the slogan "His Master's Voice" and which later became the trademark of RCA. "Little nipper" is an English colloquial term (originally a seafaring term) for a young boy or small child, so "Little Nipper" was an obvious choice of name for RCA records for children.
