= Space Mountain =

Indoor roller coaster at Disney parks

- Attraction logo at the Magic Kingdom

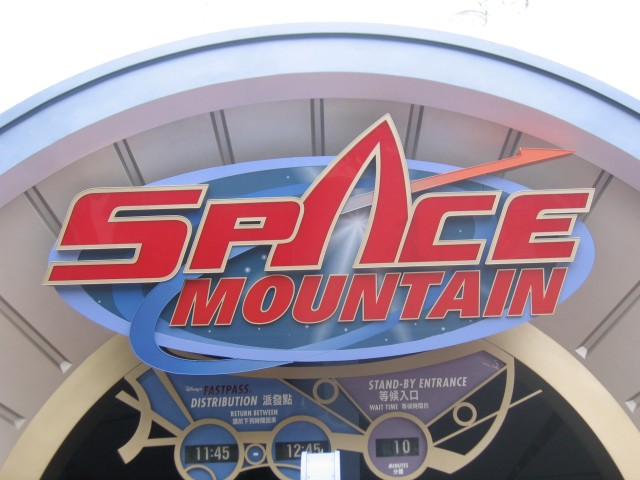
- Space Mountain entrance in the Hong Kong Disneyland version prior to Star Wars "Hyperspace" retheming

Magic Kingdom
- Area: Tomorrowland
- Coordinates: 28°25′09″N 81°34′38″W
- Status: Operating
- Opening date: January 15, 1975; 51 years ago
- Lightning Lane Available

Disneyland
- Area: Tomorrowland
- Coordinates: 33.811°N 117.9174°W
- Status: Operating
- Opening date: May 27, 1977; 49 years ago (original); July 15, 2005; 21 years ago (reopening)
- Closing date: April 10, 2003; 23 years ago (original)
- Lightning Lane Available

Tokyo Disneyland
- Area: Tomorrowland
- Coordinates: 35°37′56″N 139°52′40″E
- Status: Closed
- Opening date: April 15, 1983; 43 years ago (as Space Mountain); 2027 (as Space Mountain: Earthrise)
- Closing date: July 31, 2024; 2 years ago (as Space Mountain)
- Replaced by: Space Mountain Earthrise

Disneyland Park (Paris)
- Name: Star Wars Hyperspace Mountain
- Area: Discoveryland
- Coordinates: 48°52′26.69″N 2°46′45.30″E
- Status: Operating
- Opening date: June 1, 1995 (De la Terre à la Lune); April 5, 2005 (Space Mountain: Mission 2); May 7, 2017 (Hyperspace Mountain); TBA (De la Terre à la Lune)
- Closing date: January 15, 2005 (De la Terre à la Lune); January 8, 2017 (Space Mountain: Mission 2); Late 2027 (Hyperspace Mountain)
- Replaced: Space Mountain: Mission 2
- Disney Premier Access Available

Hong Kong Disneyland
- Name: Hyperspace Mountain 星戰極速穿梭
- Area: Tomorrowland
- Coordinates: 22°18′50.4″N 114°02′28.2″E
- Status: Operating
- Opening date: September 12, 2005; 21 years ago (as Space Mountain); June 11, 2016; 10 years ago (as Hyperspace Mountain)
- Replaced: Space Mountain (2005)
- Disney Premier Access Available

Space Mountain is a space-themed indoor roller coaster attraction located at five of the six Disneyland-style Disney Parks. Although all five versions of the attraction are different in nature, all have a similar conical exterior façade that is a landmark for the respective park. The original Space Mountain coaster opened in 1975 at Walt Disney World Resort in Florida. There are two tracks within this attraction, Alpha and Omega, which passengers can choose from. Other versions of the attraction were built at all other Disney parks except for Shanghai Disneyland.

== History ==
=== Walt Disney World ===
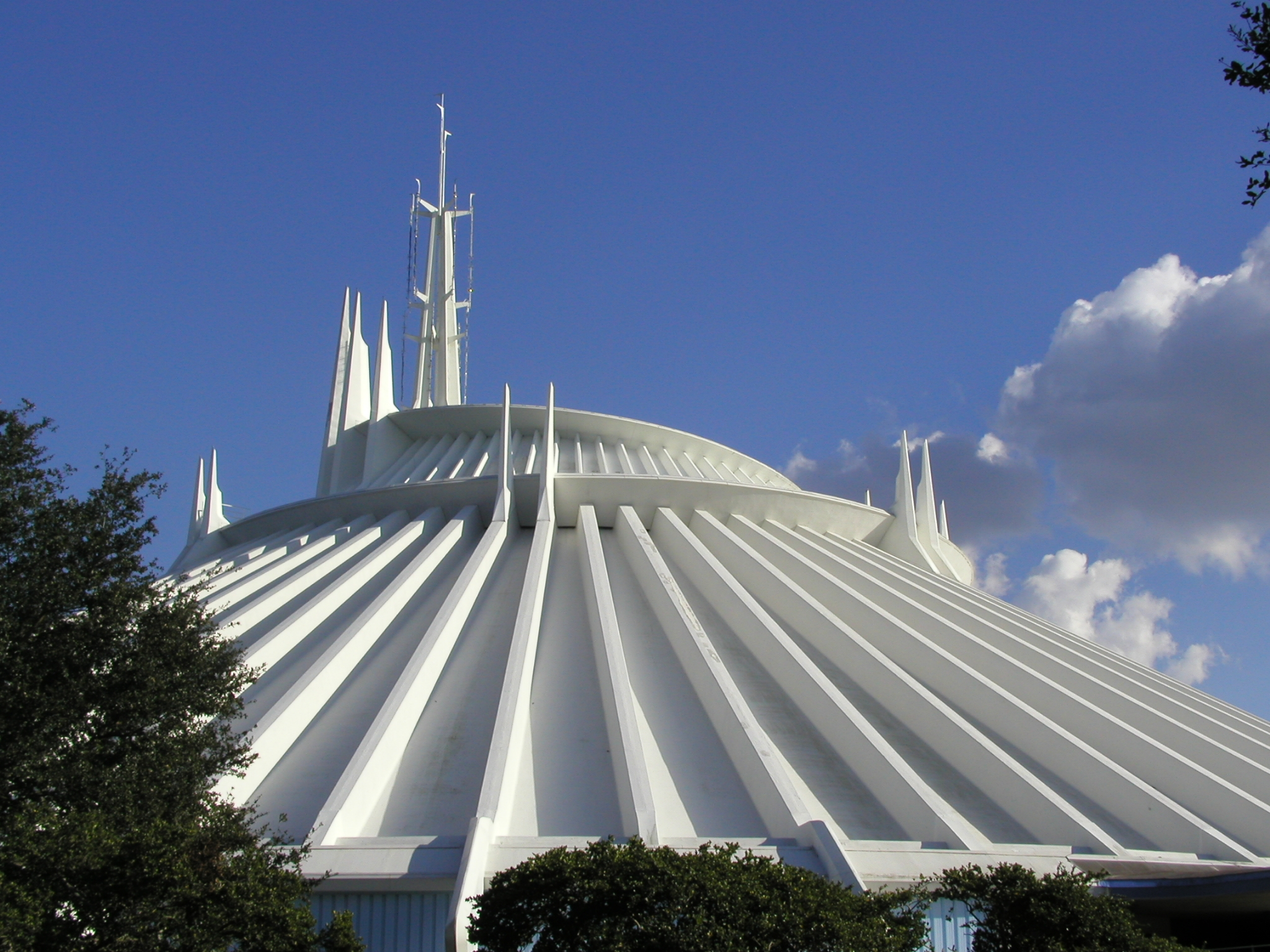
Space Mountain (Magic Kingdom)

The Space Mountain concept was a descendant of the first Disney "mountain" attraction, the Matterhorn Bobsleds at Disneyland, which opened in 1959. The Matterhorn's success had convinced Walt Disney that thrilling rides did have a place in his park.

WED partnered with Arrow Development Company, the same company that had helped design the Matterhorn's roller coaster systems years before. The initial concept was to have four separate tracks, but the technology available at the time, combined with the amount of space required versus that which was available within Disneyland, made such a design impossible.

By 1969, the concept was moved to Walt Disney World. The Magic Kingdom's Tomorrowland had the right amount of available land, and computing technology had improved significantly since the initial design phases. However, it was decided the mountain would be built outside the park, on the opposite side of the train tracks that act as the perimeter of the park. To help cover the cost of developing and building Space Mountain, Card Walker, the CEO of Walt Disney Productions, convinced RCA chairman Robert Sarnoff to sponsor the new attraction; RCA was contracted by Disney to provide the communications hardware for the Walt Disney World Resort, and their contract stated that if Disney presented an attraction of interest, RCA would provide US$10 million to support it. Space Mountain then opened on January 15, 1975.

A musical-variety episode of NBC's Wonderful World of Disney celebrated the opening on March 23, 1975. Starring actor Lucie Arnaz, it was the first Walt Disney World network special, the previous one being syndicated.

==== Ride changes ====
- When the Walt Disney World version first opened, the post-show featured new home technology created by its then-sponsor, RCA. One of the innovations was a laser disc home video system, seen playing a clip of Kurt Russell singing The Archies' hit song, "Sugar, Sugar" in a clip from The Wonderful World of Disney Haunted Mansion preview episode. Russell had also recorded "Sugar, Sugar" for his own Capitol Records LP. The RCA mascot Nipper was originally part of the ride as the iconic dog listening to a gramophone but inside of a space ship; after the end of the RCA sponsorship, Nipper was made into a robot dog.

=== Disneyland ===
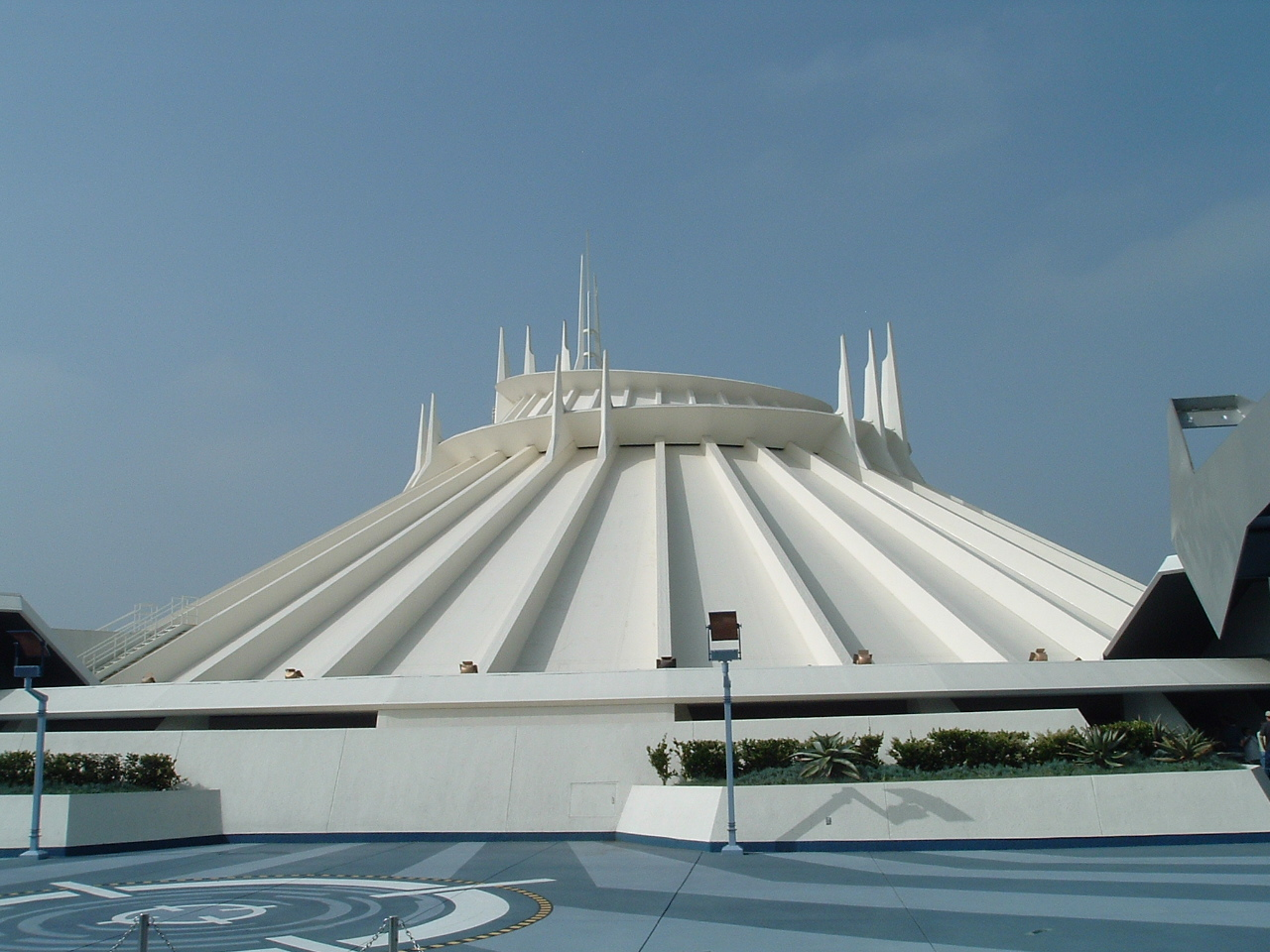
Space Mountain (Disneyland)

The success of Walt Disney World's Space Mountain prompted designers to revisit their original plan to build one for Disneyland. After two years of construction, the $20 million complex opened on May 27, 1977, including the roller coaster, 1,100-seat Space Stage, 670-seat Space Place (fast food restaurant) and Starcade.

Six of the original seven Mercury astronauts attended Space Mountain's opening: Scott Carpenter, Gordon Cooper, Senator John Glenn, Wally Schirra, Alan Shepard, and Deke Slayton. The lone exception was Gus Grissom, who had died in the Apollo 1 fire ten years earlier. Due in part to the opening of Space Mountain, the Memorial Day day attendance record was set, with 185,500 guests over the three-day period. Space Mountain at Disneyland was designed by Bill Watkins of Walt Disney Imagineering, including a tubular steel track design awarded U.S. patent 4,029,019. Due to space limitations, Disneyland's Space Mountain consists of only one track as opposed to the Magic Kingdom's two, and is of a completely different layout than either the latter park's.

=== Tokyo Disneyland ===
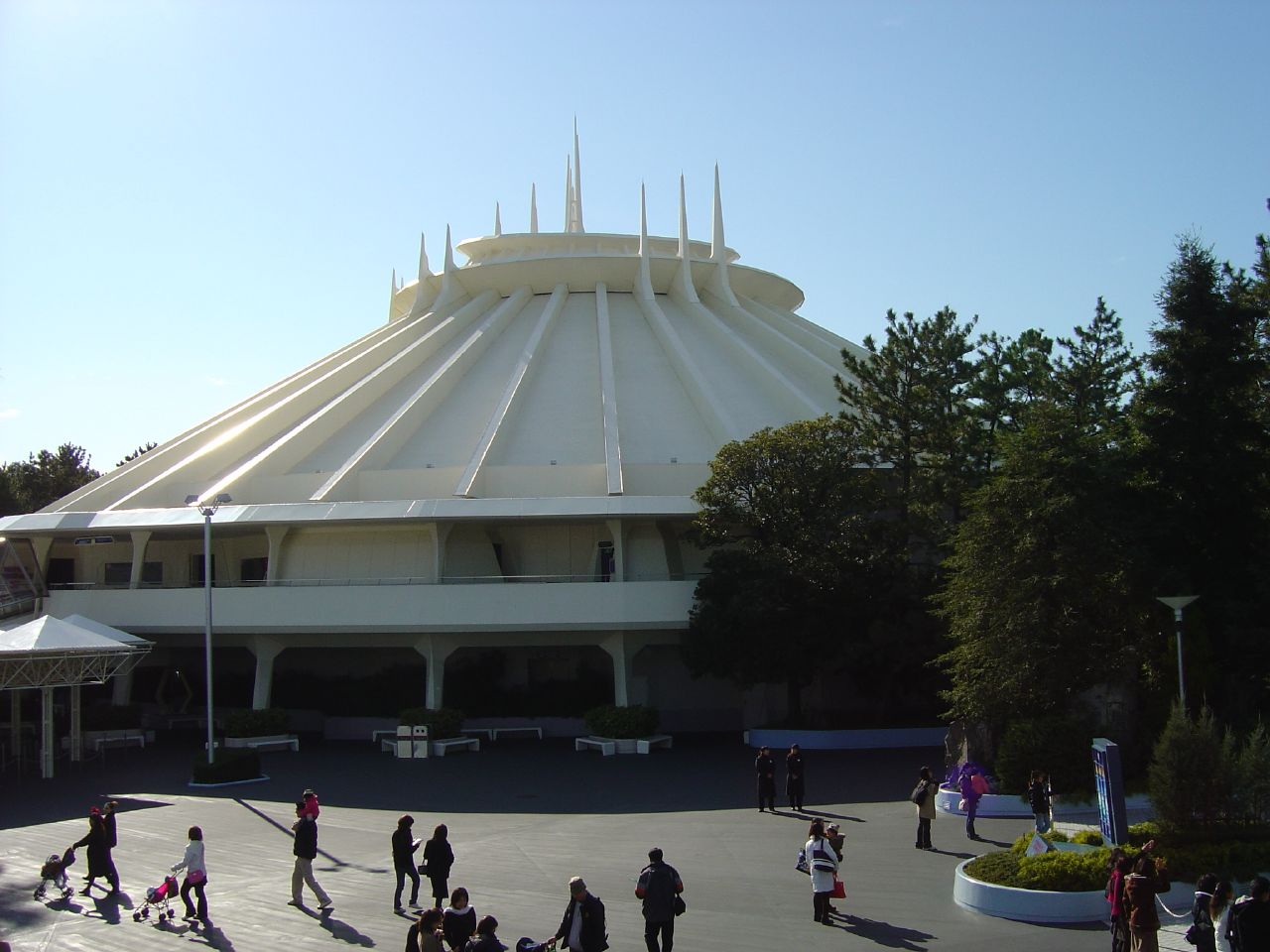
Space Mountain (Tokyo Disneyland)

Space Mountain at Tokyo Disneyland opened with the park on April 15, 1983. It was the first version of Space Mountain to open concurrently with the park. From its opening in 1983 and until late 2006, Tokyo Disneyland's Space Mountain was an almost exact clone of Disneyland's Space Mountain. The ride was then redesigned to have a more sci-fi futuristic look to it similar to refurbished Walt Disney World version, with new effects, and a new spaceport which features a futuristic spaceship hanging from the ceiling. Like its Walt Disney World counterpart, there is no ride audio to the seats.

On April 27, 2022, The Oriental Land Company announced that the current version of the attraction will close in July 31, 2024, in order to be completely rebuilt as part of a wider redevelopment of the park's Tomorrowland area. The new version of the attraction is expected to open in 2027.

The name of the new version is Space Mountain Earthrise, which was released on the official Tokyo Disney Resort Instagram page on 13 August 2026, along with Sugar Rush Sweet Rescue, a new Wreck-It Ralph attraction.

=== Disneyland Paris ===
Space Mountain (Disneyland Paris)

The version at Disneyland Paris opened on June 1, 1995, three years after the opening of the park. It was originally called De la Terre à la Lune, and was originally designed as a view on space travel from a Jules Verne-era perspective, based on the novel From the Earth to the Moon. The track is significantly different from the other four, as it's the only one to include a launch and 3 inversions (Sidewinder, Corkscrew, Horseshoe).

The ride was praised for its unique storytelling and theme, its cutting edge visual effects, and honoring the legacy of Jules Verne. It was also the first rollercoaster to feature music synced to the ride, which allowed Walt Disney Imagineering to feature the same system on future rides, such as Rock 'n' Roller Coaster. Furthermore, the success of the ride allowed Disneyland Paris to see its first profits, after the financial troubles the company had run through shortly after opening the park.

It underwent modifications in 2005 and became Space Mountain: Mission 2. This journey was slightly different from the first as it took riders beyond the Moon, to the very edge of the universe. In January 2015 the ride closed for yet another refurbishment and was reopened in August 2015. The ride temporarily closed on January 8, 2017 and was replaced with Star Wars: Hyperspace Mountain on May 7.

On the second day of the D23 Fan Event 2026, it was announced that Hyperspace Mountain would be closing and changing back to its original version, Space Mountain: De la Terre à la Lune, in late 2027.

=== Hong Kong Disneyland ===
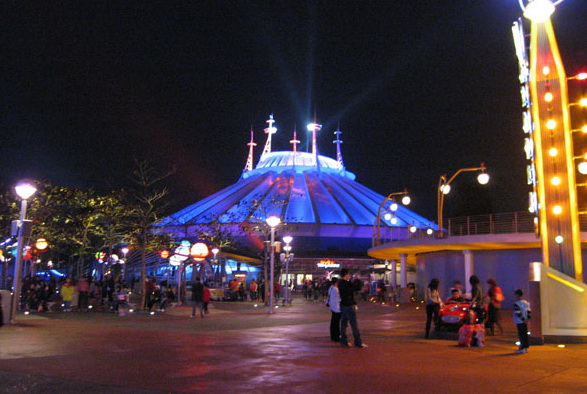
Space Mountain prior to Star Wars "Hyperspace" retheming (Hong Kong Disneyland)

Space Mountain at Hong Kong Disneyland was based on the refurbished Space Mountain at Disneyland, with a similar soundtrack and the same layout. It also featured new show elements not presented in the refurbished California version (i.e. a "hyperspeed" tunnel). It did not feature the Rockin' Space Mountain configuration that was featured in Disneyland's Space Mountain in 2007.

Unlike most Space Mountains, the boarding area for the attraction is quite small. Not present is a Space Station of its two most similar counterparts at Disneyland and Tokyo Disneyland. Instead, a dark queue featuring neon earth-tone colored planets along with star patterns decorate the area. Lining the walls of the station are colored neon light bars that are used for lighting and decoration.

Similar to the Disneyland Paris version of the ride, its Star Wars "Hyperspace Mountain" overlay theming, originally meant to be temporary, has become the permanent theme of the ride. The queue area has been fully refurbished with the addition of a full-sized replica X-Wing, a character meeting area as well as a grey and white Star Wars queueline theme, although some elements of the original queue have also remained intact such as the planet models and star patterns. The ride's storyline is identical to the Disneyland Paris version.

== Ghost Galaxy ==
Space Mountain: Ghost Galaxy

Hong Kong Disneyland
- Area: Tomorrowland
- Status: Removed
- Opening date: September 24, 2007
- Closing date: October 31, 2013

Disneyland
- Area: Tomorrowland
- Status: Removed
- Opening date: September 25, 2009
- Closing date: October 31, 2018
- Replaced: Space Mountain: Nightmare Nebula

Ride statistics
- Designer: Walt Disney Imagineering
- Must transfer from wheelchair

Space Mountain: Ghost Galaxy (Traditional Chinese: 驚心動魄太空山) was a seasonal Halloween overlay of Space Mountain at Hong Kong Disneyland and Disneyland. It first premiered at Hong Kong Disneyland in 2007, and premiered at Disneyland on September 25, 2009, as part of the Halloween season at the parks. The latter made use of effects previously used for the Rockin' Space Mountain overlay in 2007.

Inside the space station, the planet screen at the front of the station had been changed to reflect the overlay, as well. While viewing the planet, a green "storm" appeared over the planet, causing interruptions to the video feed. Static appeared, then a blue screen, reminiscent of the Windows Blue Screen of Death, saying "LOSS OF SIGNAL...," "SEARCHING..." and "SIGNAL ESTABLISHED". Outside on the dome, five projections played, with several Halloween-themed color schemes appearing between these projection shows:

- The first projection showed the dome becoming a dull grey, with cracks and breaks forming on the dome. Suddenly, the dome seemed to crumble and fall into nothingness. Then, a green grid appeared at the top section of the dome, accompanied with a loud humming sound.
- The second projection showed an alien arm resembling that of the nebula ghost running, pushing against the dome from the inside.
- The third projection showed yellow scratch marks appearing on the dome.
- The fourth projection showed lightning bolts shooting up the left side of the dome, then the right, the middle, and finally the entire dome itself.
- The last projection showed the dome being turned into a bluish-purple radar, with explosions that appeared on the dome, resembling activity of the nebula ghosts.

=== Ride changes ===
With the refurbishments to Space Mountain, Ghost Galaxy had some significant changes.

- The soundtrack echoed the attraction
- The red lights at the top of the first lift hill were an eerie green.
- The flashing blue light tunnel between the first and second lift hills were pitch black.
- Instead of the spinning galaxy beyond the second lift, a giant ghost nebula electrified the lift.
- Projections of otherworldly wisps could be seen before the final lift, along with the ghostly nebula.
- The ghosts popped up unexpectedly. Two places that were notorious for this were at a steep drop near the end as trains narrowly avoided being "clawed" by an unseen arm. The other spot was a ghostly head that popped out of the wall after the onride picture is taken when the train makes the final right turn to reenter the station.

== Star Wars: Hyperspace Mountain ==
Star Wars: Hyperspace Mountain is a seasonal version of Space Mountain at Disneyland. The Star Wars themed overlay of the ride first made its debut in Disneyland on November 16, 2015 at the "Season of the Force" event held at the parks to celebrate the release of The Force Awakens. The Star Wars theming of the ride then became the permanent main attraction at both Disneyland Paris and Hong Kong Disneyland. The parks will periodically re-theme Space Mountain back to Hyperspace Mountain for a select few days of the year in the instance of special events at the parks. The ride becomes Star Wars themed again with the release of every Star Wars movie since The Force Awakens and for special events held at the parks such as Disneyland After Dark: 80s Nite.

=== Ride changes ===
- The line queue has special Star Wars themed lore and safety videos.
- The launch tunnel includes voiceovers of pilots speaking and a projection of stars.
- The car accelerates at the end of the launch tunnel to simulate entering "lightspeed".
- John Williams' music from Star Wars plays throughout the duration of the ride.
- A projection is displayed of a journey to the planet Jakku where the riders encounter TIE fighters and X-Wings.

== Rockin' Space Mountain ==
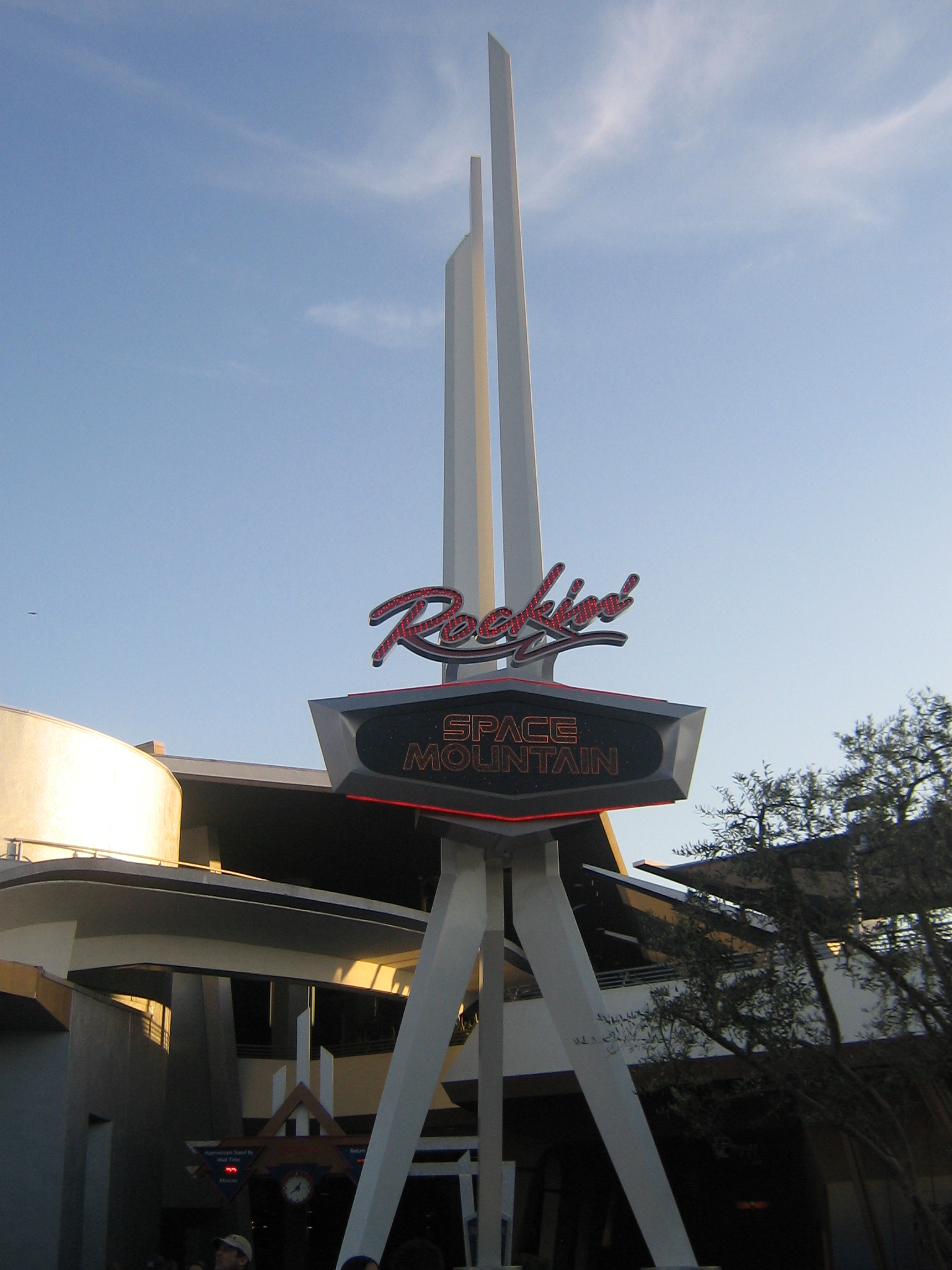
Rockin' Space Mountain entrance (Disneyland)

Rockin' Space Mountain was a version of Space Mountain in Disneyland that was first presented as part of the "Year of a Million Dreams" Celebration at the parks in 2007. The ride was designed to transform from the original version of Space Mountain to this special edition at night time only. The concept was created by Disney Grad Nites which were private events not held for the general public. These special events are where they first began the concept of re-theming rides.

=== Ride changes ===
- The soundtrack is changed to the song "Higher Ground" by the Red Hot Chili Peppers
- Colored, flashing lights are along the track
- "Uncle" Joe Benson, a radio disc jockey from the Disney-owned 95.5 KLOS, welcomes riders

== Film ==
Screenwriter Max Landis wrote a feature film based on the Space Mountain attraction, which was developed for a short time at Disney. The film was based in a 1950s Jetsons-esque retro-future. This idea of the future wouldn't contain the internet or cell phones but would be powered by many large contraptions and robots. One key plot point of the film involved the idea of people getting sent into hyperspace and, upon their return, realizing their souls had gone missing from them and they would eventually transform into terrifying monsters. The film was ultimately scrapped.

On October 9, 2020, a new film adaptation of the ride was announced to be in development at Disney, with Joby Harold producing and writing the film alongside Tory Tunnell producing under their Safehouse Pictures banner. Dan Lin and Jonathan Eirich of Rideback will also produce. Unlike the original idea, the film is described as a family adventure.

The Space Mountain building is featured as an "easter egg" in the Disney films Meet the Robinsons (alongside Rocket Jets) and Tomorrowland.

On April 19, 2024, it was announced that Josh Appelbaum and André Nemec had been tapped to write a script for a Space Mountain film for Disney.

== Graphic novel ==
In November 2013, Disney Publishing Worldwide revived Disney Comics as an imprint in the US with the imprint's first publication was the Space Mountain graphic novel, its first original graphic novel, released on May 7, 2014. This book presented Space Mountain as a research station orbiting a black hole and harnessing its power to travel through time. During the course of the time travel adventure, Space Mountain takes on the form of its Parisian version in a darker timeline.
