= The Children of Captain Grant (film) =

- Directed by: Vladimir Vaynshtok; David Gutman
- Written by: Jules Verne (novel); Oleg Leonidov
- Produced by: L. Sokolovsky; M. Zarzhiykaya
- Starring: Nikolai Cherkasov; Ivan Chuvelyov; Yuri Yuryev; Mariya Strelkova
- Cinematography: Arkadi Koltsaty; Aleksandr Ptushko
- Edited by: Tatyana Likhachyova
- Music by: Isaak Dunayevsky
- Production company: Mosfilm
- Release date: 15 September 1936
- Running time: 88 minutes
- Country: Soviet Union
- Language: Russian

The Children of Captain Grant (Russian: Дети капитана Гранта, romanized: Deti kapitana Granta) is a 1936 Soviet adventure film directed by Vladimir Vaynshtok and David Gutman and starring Nikolai Cherkasov, Ivan Chuvelyov and Yuri Yuryev. It is an adaptation of the 1868 novel In Search of the Castaways by Jules Verne. The film was popular on its release, and was followed in 1941 by another Verne adaptation Mysterious Island. In the 1860s, two Scottish children go on a global search for their missing father, the sailor Captain Grant.

== Plot ==
The crew of the Duncan yacht belonging to Lord Glenarvan, catches a shark in the waters of Scotland. When cutting the carcass, a bottle is found inside the fish, in which a request for assistance is written in three languages from a victim of a shipwreck. The documents have been strongly spoiled by water, however they manage to decipher that Captain Grant's ship has crashed on the 37th degree south latitude. It is not possible to determine the longitude of the crash site.

Glenarvan goes to London to organize a rescue mission, but the government denies him, citing the vagueness and inadequacy of information. The implicit cause of the rejection was Captain Grant being a Scottish patriot who dreamed of independence for Scotland. Moreover, the main purpose of his voyage was to establish Nova Scotia.

During the absence of the Lord, Captain Grant's children, son and daughter came to the boat in the hope to learn something about their father. When Glenarvan returns home, his wife persuades him to go in search of the captain on the Duncan.

The travelers move by land and sea, cross Patagonia by the 37th parallel, visit the islands of Tristan da Cunha, and Amsterdam, pass by the south-eastern Australia and New Zealand. Having experienced many dangerous adventures, they find Captain Grant on the small island of Tabor, which is also located at the 37° south latitude.

== Cast ==
- Nikolai Vitovtov as Edward Glenarvan
- Mariya Strelkova as Elen Glenarvan
- Nikolay Cherkasov as Jacques Paganel
- Yakov Segel as Robert Grant
- Olga Bazarova as Mary Grant
- Mikhail Romanov as Captain John Mangles
- David Gutman as MacNabs
- Ivan Chuvelyov as Ayerton
- Yuri Yuryev as captain Tom Grant
- Nikolai Michurin as Innkeeper
- Nikolay Adelung as Talkav
- Iona Byi-Brodsky as consul (uncredited)

== Soundtrack ==
In the film there are two songs composed by Isaak Dunayevsky based on the lyrics of Vasily Lebedev-Kumach:

- "Song of the Captain" ("There was once a brave captain"), performed by Nikolai Cherkasov;
- "Robert's Song" ("Sing us a song, merry wind…") performed by K. Krasheninnikovaya and Lyalya Sateeva;

and the famous orchestral overture also composed by Isaak Dunayevsky.

== Production ==
- Initially Robert Grant's role was planned for another actor. During filming on location in Nalchik, it became clear that the child playing the role of Robert Grant was afraid of horses. After this, Yakov Segel who passed the audition was called up for the filming of the main role. According to Yakov Segel's recollections he was taught how to ride a horse in only one night by cinematographer Alexander Ptushko who previously served in the First Cavalry Army.

== Legacy ==
The 45th anniversary of the film was celebrated in the "Udarnik" state cinema. It was attended by three of the surviving members of the film's cast: assistant director Leonid Knyazhinskiy; Yakov Segel, who played the title role of Grant; and the assistant makeup artist N. Maslennikov.

In 1986 a new film adaptation was released: In Search of Captain Grant, where the popular melody written by Isaac Dunayevsky from the film was reused.

== Bibliography ==
- Evgeny Dobrenko & Marina Balina. The Cambridge Companion to Twentieth-Century Russian Literature. Cambridge University Press, 2011.
