= Absent-minded professor =

Stock character in film

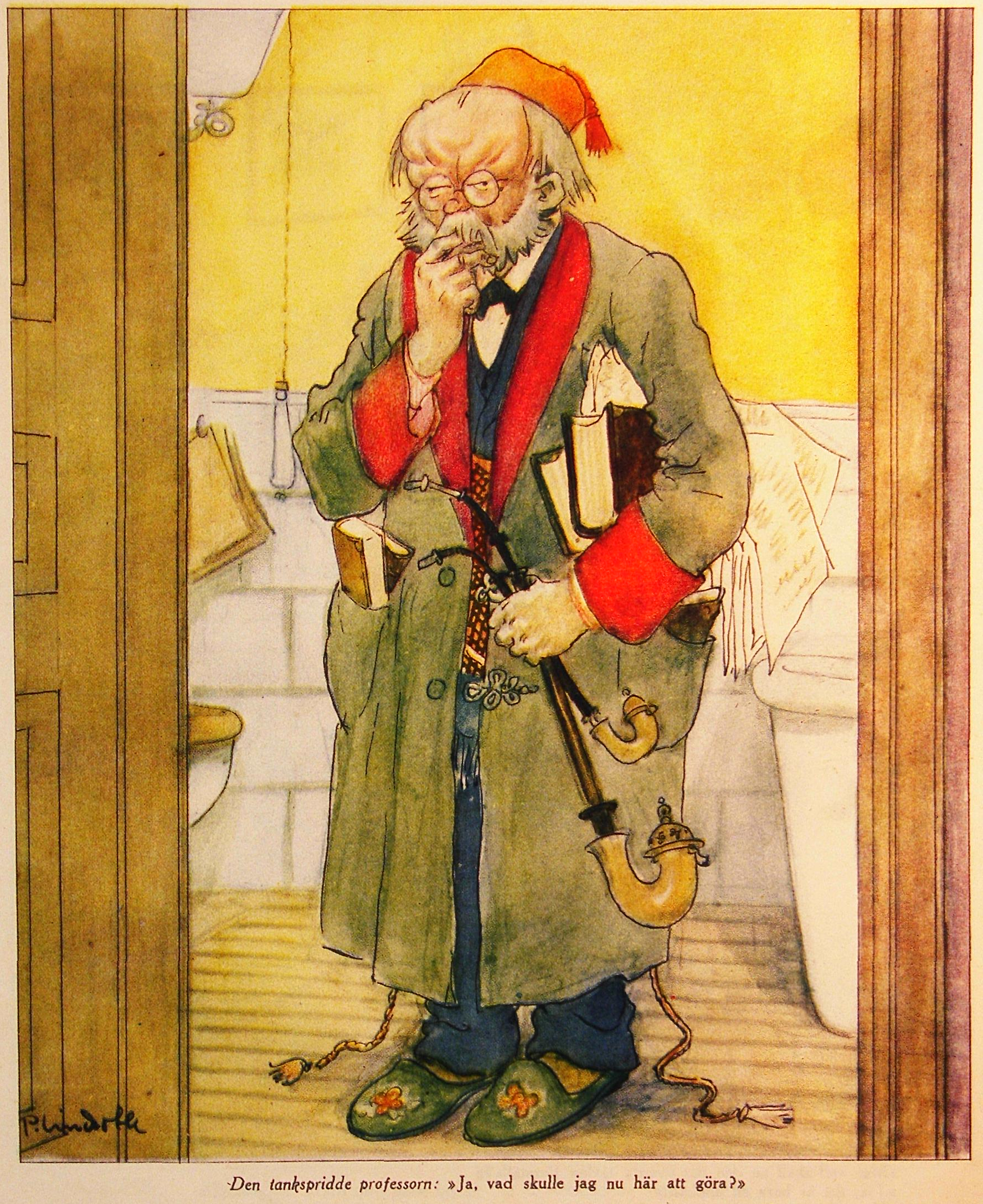
Per Lindroth, 1929, Den tankspridde professorn (The Absent-minded Professor)

The absent-minded professor is a stock character of popular fiction, usually portrayed as a talented scholar whose academic brilliance is accompanied by below-par functioning in other areas, leading to forgetfulness and mistakes. One explanation of this is that highly-talented individuals often have unevenly distributed capabilities, being brilliant in their field of choice but below average on other measures of ability. Alternatively, they are considered to be so engrossed in their field of study that they forget their surroundings. The phrase is also commonly used in English to describe people who are so engrossed in their own world that they fail to keep track of their surroundings. It is a common stereotype that professors get so obsessed with their research that they pay little attention to anything else.

The archetype is sometimes mixed with that of the mad scientist, often for comic effect, as in the Jerry Lewis film The Nutty Professor or the Professor Bacterio in the Mortadelo y Filemón comics and movies. However, a distinction is usually made that absent-minded professors are forgetful and careless rather than maliciously or callously causing harm.

== Examples of real scholars ==
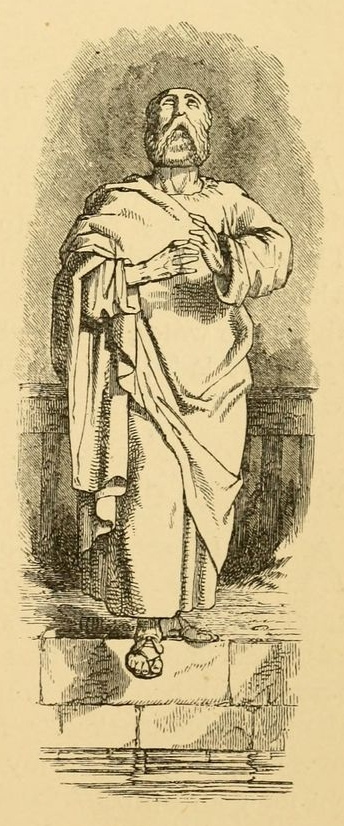
"The Astrologer who Fell into a Well" – John Tenniel's illustration from an 1884 edition of Aesop's fables, based on a story about Thales of Miletus

The archetype is very old: the ancient Greek biographer Diogenes Laërtius wrote that the philosopher Thales walked at night with his eyes focused on the heavens and, as a result, fell down a well. A similar story is recounted of the ancient Indian philosopher Akṣapāda Gautama, the author of the Nyaya Sutras. As per the story, Gautama was always so engrossed in contemplation, that he would not even see things directly in front of him. Owing to this, Brahmā granted him with eyes (akṣa) on his feet (pāda), so that he could navigate himself, thus giving him the name Akṣapāda.

Thomas Aquinas, Isaac Newton, Adam Smith, André-Marie Ampère, Jacques Hadamard, Sewall Wright, Nikola Tesla, Norbert Wiener, Archimedes, Pierre Curie and Albert Einstein were all scholars considered to be absent-minded – their attention absorbed by their academic studies. William Archibald Spooner, who gave his name to the spoonerism, was known for his absent-mindedness and eccentricity.

== Fictitious examples ==
The fictional absent-minded professor is often a college professor of science or engineering; in the fantasy genre, a similar character may appear as a wizard. Examples of this include the characterisation of Merlin in The Sword in the Stone (particularly in the Disney adaptation) and Albus Dumbledore in the Harry Potter series. "Doc" Emmett Brown from Back to the Future is an example of an absent-minded scientist-inventor character. He is depicted as strange, eccentric, or insane. Another example is the title character in the film The Absent-Minded Professor and its less successful film remakes, all based on the short story "A Situation of Gravity" by Samuel W. Taylor. Examples in television include Professor Farnsworth in Futurama, Professor Frink in The Simpsons, Walter Bishop in the Fox television series Fringe, and Professor Von Schlemmer in Adventures of Sonic the Hedgehog. Multo, one of the characters in the children's series The Zula Patrol, is another example of an absent-minded professor.

Professor Kokintz in The Mouse That Roared by Leonard Wibberley is an example from literature. Professor Branestawm, created in the 1930s by Norman Hunter, is an earlier example of the archetype, and Jacques Paganel from the Jules Verne's 1867 novel In Search of the Castaways is probably the codifier of the archetype in the modern literature. Professor Caractacus Potts in the story of Chitty Chitty Bang Bang qualifies as an absent-minded inventor. Comic strip examples include Professor Calculus in The Adventures of Tintin; Eli Eon in Little Orphan Annie; the Professor in British comic Rupert Bear; and Professor Edgewise, a minor recurring character in Marvel Family stories. Isaac Kleiner from the Half-Life saga, Professor E. Gadd from the Luigi's Mansion series and Professor Harold MacDougal from Red Dead Redemption are examples in video games.

== See also ==
- Asperger syndrome
- Autism
- Attention deficit hyperactivity disorder predominantly inattentive
- Creativity and mental illness
- Savant syndrome
- Wise old man
