= The Poet and the Tsar =

1927 film

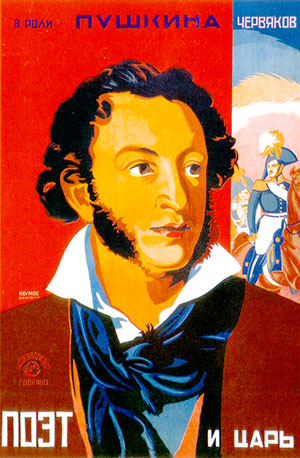
- Directed by: Vladimir Gardin; Yevgeni Chervyakov
- Written by: Vladimir Gardin; Yevgeni Chervyakov
- Cinematography: Naum Aptekman; Svyatoslav Belyayev
- Production company: Sovkino
- Release date: 1927
- Country: Soviet Union
- Languages: Silent; Russian intertitles

The Poet and the Tsar (Russian: Поэт и царь, romanized: Poet i tsar) is a 1927 Soviet silent biopic film directed by Vladimir Gardin and Yevgeni Chervyakov.

== Plot ==
Tsar Nikolai I is infatuated with Natalia Goncharova, wife of Alexander Pushkin. Trying to hide his passion, the tsar helps Natalia get closer with officer d'Anthès. The whole royal court gossips about the relationship of Natalia with d'Anthès. These rumors reach Pushkin and he challenges d'Anthès to a duel ...

== Cast ==
- Yevgeni Chervyakov as Alexander Pushkin
- Irina Volodko as Natalie Pushkina
- Konstantin Karenin as Nicholas I of Russia
- Boris Tumarin as Baron d'Anthès
- Leonid Tkachov as Pyotr Vyazemsky
- Yevgenia Rosiner as Aleksandra, Nathalie's sister
- Aleksei Feona as Vasily Zhukovsky
- Ivan Lerskiy as Faddey Bulgarin
- Aleksandr Larikov as Nikita
- Olga Spirova as Yekaterina, Nathalie's sister
- Ivan Khudoleyev as Baron Alexander von Benckendorff
- Zoya Valevskaya as Idalia Poletika
- Anatoli Nelidov as Ivan Krylov
- Fyodor Lopukhov as Nikolai Gogol
- Gennadiy Michurin as Konstantin Danzas
- Yevgeni Boronikhin as Vladimir Dahl
- Nikolai Cherkasov as Charles, the barber
- Valeri Plotnikov as Baron de Heeckeren
- Mariya Dobrova as Alexandra Smirnova
- Pyotr Podvalny as viscount d'Archiac
- Yevgeniya Rogulina

== Bibliography ==
- Christie, Ian & Taylor, Richard. The Film Factory: Russian and Soviet Cinema in Documents 1896-1939. Routledge, 2012.
