= Van Heeckeren =

Dutch noble family

van Heeckeren
- noble family
- Country: Netherlands
- Founded: 15th century
- Founder: Jakob van Heker

Van Heeckeren is an old Dutch noble family from the Dutch provinces Overijssel and Gelderland.

== History ==
The earliest bearer of the name may have taken it from the town of Ekeren, which was also referred to in 1167 as Hecerna.

The oldest known ancestor is Jakob van Heker, who died in 1440. The family is split into many branches (van Brandsenburg, van Kell, van Molecaten). The Heeckerens have the same coat of arms as the Rechteren family. Members carry the title of baron.

== Famous members ==
- Georges-Charles de Heeckeren d'Anthès (through adoption), politician who killed Alexander Pushkin in a duel.
- Jacob van Heeckeren tot Enghuizen, diplomat.
- Jacob Derk Carel van Heeckeren, politician.

== Gallery ==
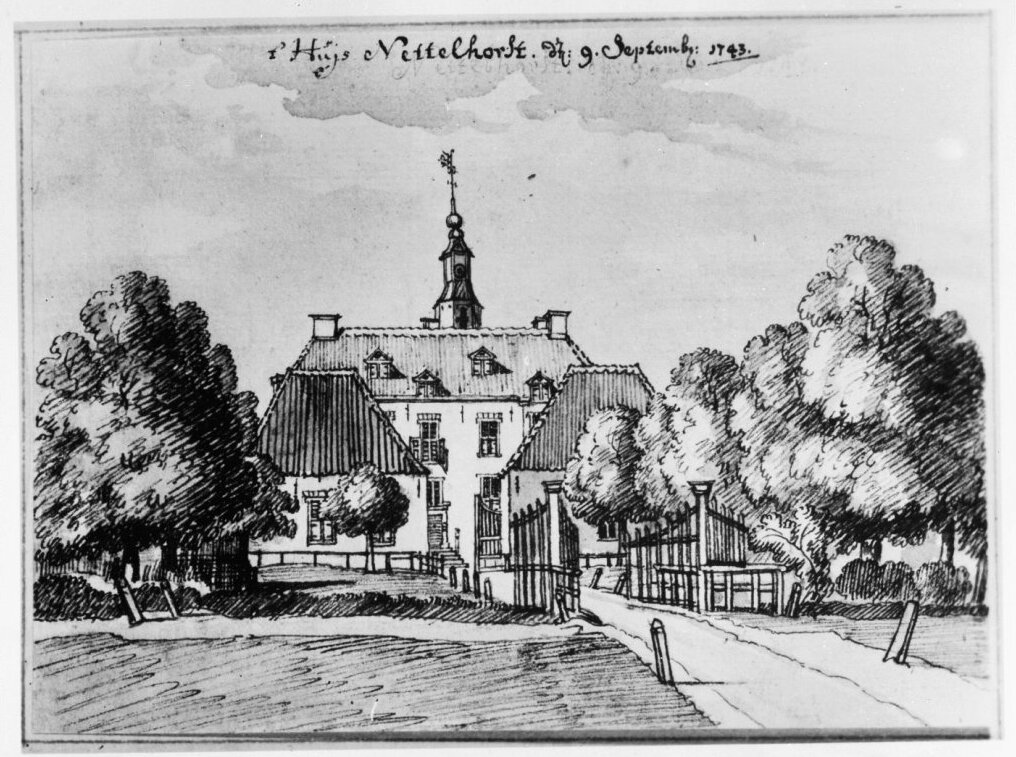
The Nettelhorst estate, painted by J. de Beyer in 1743.

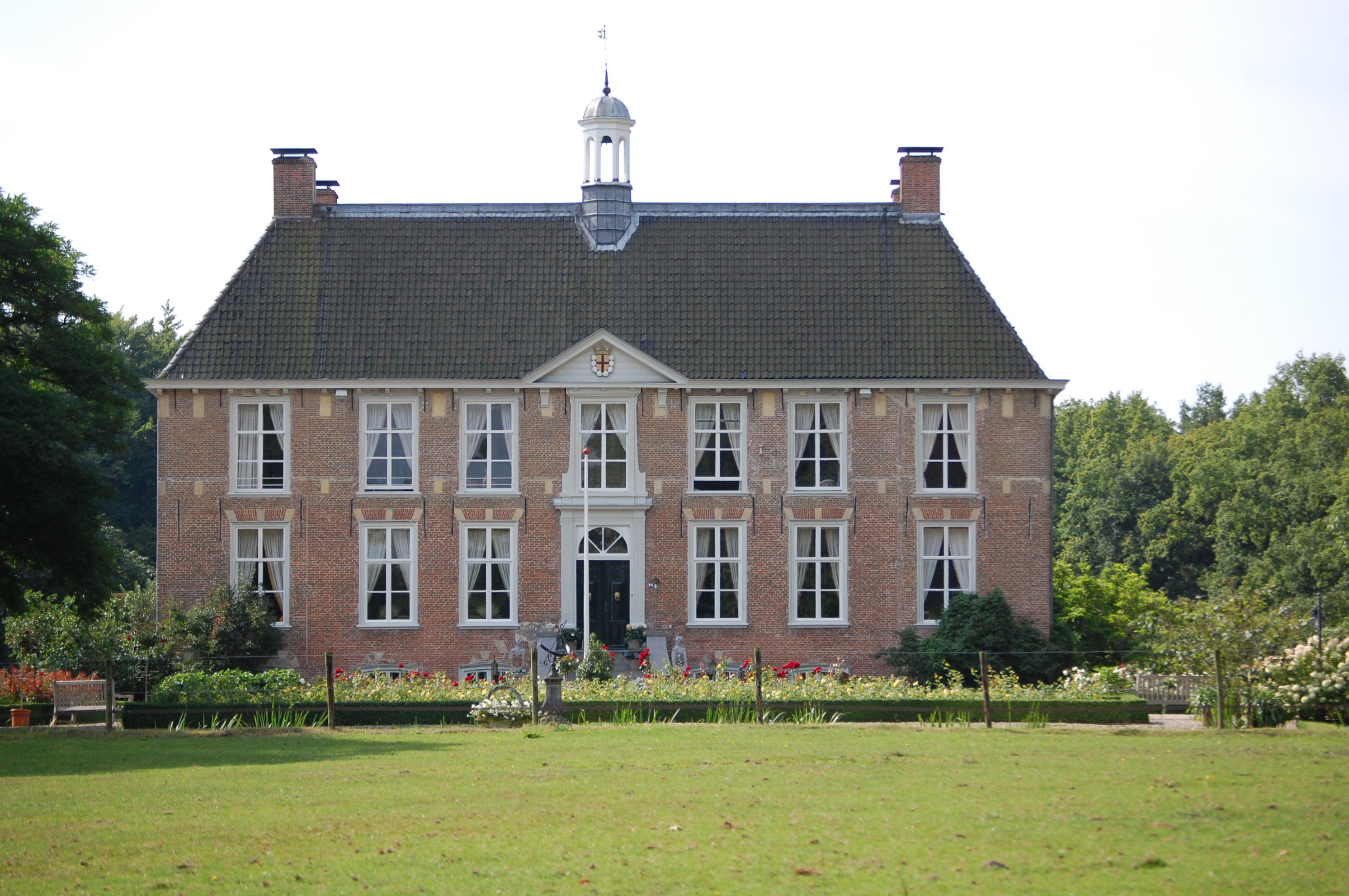
Molecaten estate owned by the Heeckeren family

== See also ==
- Huis te Ruurlo

== Literature ==
- Dr. D.P.M. Graswinckel en Mr. H. Hardenberg, 'Het Archief van het Kasteel Rechteren' (Zaltbommel, 1941).
- A.F.H. van Heeckeren,'Genealogie van de geslachten Van Voorst, Van Heeckeren, Van Rechteren' in: Heraldieke Bibliotheek (1876).
- Prof. Dr. J.G.N. Renaud et al., 'Het kasteel Voorst- Macht en val van een Overijsselse burcht' (Zwolle, 1983).
