= In Search of the Castaways (film) =

1962 film by Robert Stevenson

- Theatrical release poster
- Directed by: Robert Stevenson
- Screenplay by: Lowell S. Hawley
- Based on: In Search of the Castaways by Jules Verne
- Produced by: Walt Disney
- Starring: Maurice Chevalier; Hayley Mills; George Sanders; Wilfrid Hyde-White; Michael Anderson Jr. Keith Hamshere; Antonio Cifariello
- Cinematography: Paul Beeson
- Edited by: Gordon Stone
- Music by: Music Composed by: William Alwyn; Musical Director: Muir Mathieson; Songs: Richard M. Sherman; Robert B. Sherman
- Production company: Walt Disney Productions
- Distributed by: Buena Vista Distribution
- Release dates: November 14, 1962 (London, premiere); December 19, 1962 (US)
- Running time: 98 minutes
- Country: United States
- Language: English
- Box office: $21,745,500

In Search of the Castaways (also known as The Castaways) is a 1962 American adventure film starring Maurice Chevalier and Hayley Mills in a tale about a worldwide search for a shipwrecked sea captain. The film was produced by Walt Disney Productions and directed by Robert Stevenson from a screenplay by Lowell S. Hawley, based upon Jules Verne's 1868 adventure novel Captain Grant's Children.

In Search of the Castaways was the third of six films Hayley Mills starred in at Disney.

== Plot ==
In Britain in 1858, Professor Paganel, a scientifically thinking French geography professor, finds a bottle containing a note which he believes to have been written by the missing Captain John Grant. Paganel and Grant's two teenaged children, Mary and Robert, approach John Glenarvan and his father, the wealthy shipping magnate Lord Glenarvan, the owner of Captain Grant's ship, and persuade them to finance a search expedition. The expedition sets sail and ventures halfway around the world to South America.

In the Andes, an earthquake sends them down a mountain on a glacier. A giant condor snatches up Robert but Thalcave, an Indian chief, rescues him. He later claims to know the whereabouts of Captain Grant. After surviving a tidal wave and a lightning storm, the group discovers that the well-meaning Thalcave was mistaken. But they do free three prisoners who are grateful enough to join their expedition. Meanwhile, a budding romance develops between young Mary Grant and Lord Glenarvan's son John.

They then depart for Australia, where Paganel feels sure they will find Captain Grant. In Melbourne they meet a treacherous gunrunner, Thomas Ayerton, who produces evidence that Captain Grant is in New Zealand. Unaware that Ayerton is the third mate who caused a mutiny on Grant's ship, the search party once more sets sail. Ayerton causes another mutiny and sets the group adrift. They are captured by Maori cannibals, and are imprisoned along with Captain Grant's shipmate, Bill Gaye, who helps them escape to a volcano. They evade their pursuers by starting an avalanche which triggers an eruption.

They finally find Captain Grant, overcome Ayerton and his mutineers, and sail for home. As they all sit around talking, the note that Professor Paganel initially found (and that was supposedly in Captain Grant's handwriting) is brought up. Captain Grant states that he never wrote any note, to which Bill says: "The voice be the voice of a God-fearing man. But the hands are the hands of a forger," implying that he imitated Captain Grant's handwriting and wrote the note himself. In the final scene, the Professor points out John and Mary stargazing out at the railing, clearly falling for one another.

== Cast ==
Hayley Mills, Jack Gwillim and Keith Hamshere

- Maurice Chevalier as Jacques Paganel
- Hayley Mills as Mary Grant
- George Sanders as Thomas Ayerton
- Wilfrid Hyde-White as Lord Glenarvan
- Michael Anderson Jr. as John Glenarvan
- Keith Hamshere as Robert Grant
- Antonio Cifariello as Thalcave, the Indian Chief
- Wilfrid Brambell as Bill Gaye
- Jack Gwillim as Captain Grant
- Inia Te Wiata as Maori Chief
- Ronald Fraser as guard at dockyard gate
- Norman Bird as senior yacht guard
- George Murcell as Ayerton's assistant
- Mark Dignam as rich man at yacht party
- Michael Wynne as crooked sailor
- David Spenser as South American guide
- Milo Sperber as crooked sailor
- Roger Delgado as Patagonian prisoner
- Barry Keegan as Irish claimant
- Maxwell Shaw as sailor
- Andreas Malandrinos as crooked sailor

== Production ==
The film was originally called The Castaways. It was devised by Disney specifically as a vehicle for Hayley Mills, who was under contract to the studio to make a film a year for five years. Disney wanted to age her gradually on screen and she would have her first case of "puppy love" in the film. Disney wanted Mills' brother Jonathan to play her brother on screen but his school teachers turned it down.

In April 1961, Disney announced they would make the film with Mills and Charles Laughton with Hugh Attool to produce and Robert Stevenson to direct. Maurice Chevalier then came on board with production to begin in June. The role of Mills' brother went to Keith Hamshere, who played the lead in Oliver! on stage.

Laughton ended up dropping out of the film. In January 1962, he was diagnosed with the cancer which caused his death in December.

Principal photography was at Pinewood Studios in England. Disney said this was done because Mills' contract "calls for alternating her pictures here and there each year".

== Musical numbers ==
Songs composed by the Sherman Brothers include "Castaway", "Merci Beaucoup", "Let's Climb (Grimpons)" and "Enjoy It", with an orchestral arrangement of "Castaway" serving as the film's overture.

Maurice Chevalier later sang the Sherman Brothers' theme song "The Aristocats" from Disney's 1970 animated film The Aristocats.

== Reception ==
=== Box office ===
In Search of the Castaways was a commercial success. Upon its initial release, it earned $4.9 million in North American theatrical rentals. It was one of the 12 most popular movies at the British box office in 1963.

=== Critical ===
The New York Times declared: "It is, as we say, a whopping fable, more gimmicky than imaginative, but it doesn't lack for lively melodrama that is more innocent and wholesome than much of the stuff the children see these days on television".

A review in Variety said: "Walt Disney has come up with another splendid piece of spectacular hokum, lavishly coloured and packed with incident and special effects. It can hardly fail to appeal to all types of audience, though apparently aimed mainly at the moppets".

The Monthly Film Bulletin wrote: "Well timed for Christmas, this film is designed to keep the family wide awake after the plum-pudding, when the critical faculties are not too sharp. Attention is discreetly drawn away from the rather cardboard characters, and the Fauntleroy smile of Michael Anderson, by a kaleidoscope of colour and movement".

== See also ==
- List of American films of 1962
- List of films set in New Zealand
