= Jacob Derk Carel van Heeckeren =

Baron Jacob Derk Carel van Heeckeren van Kell (October 31, 1730 – July 11, 1795) was a member of the Dutch noble family van Heeckeren. Van Heeckeren studied law at Leiden University. Before 1752 he was working for prince William IV and later became advisor to prince William V. In 1780 he was named constable.

Among his political duties he was the special deputy to Maastricht and Overmaas, he also was schout of Heerlen. When exactly he became schout of Heerlen is unknown, however he was schout before 1756 and remained schout till 1795, when Heerlen was taken over by France.

Preceded by Assueer van Heeckeren	Baron of Ruurlo; 1768?–1795	Succeeded by Willem Hendrik Alexander Carel van Heeckeren van Kell
Preceded by ?	Baron of Kell ?–1795	Succeeded by Willem Hendrik Alexander Carel van Heeckeren van Kell
Preceded by Balthasar Collard	Schout of Heerlen <1749–1795	Succeeded by None, office continues as Mare (Frans Robroeck)
