= Chevalier Guard Regiment =

Chevalier Guard Regiment — III —
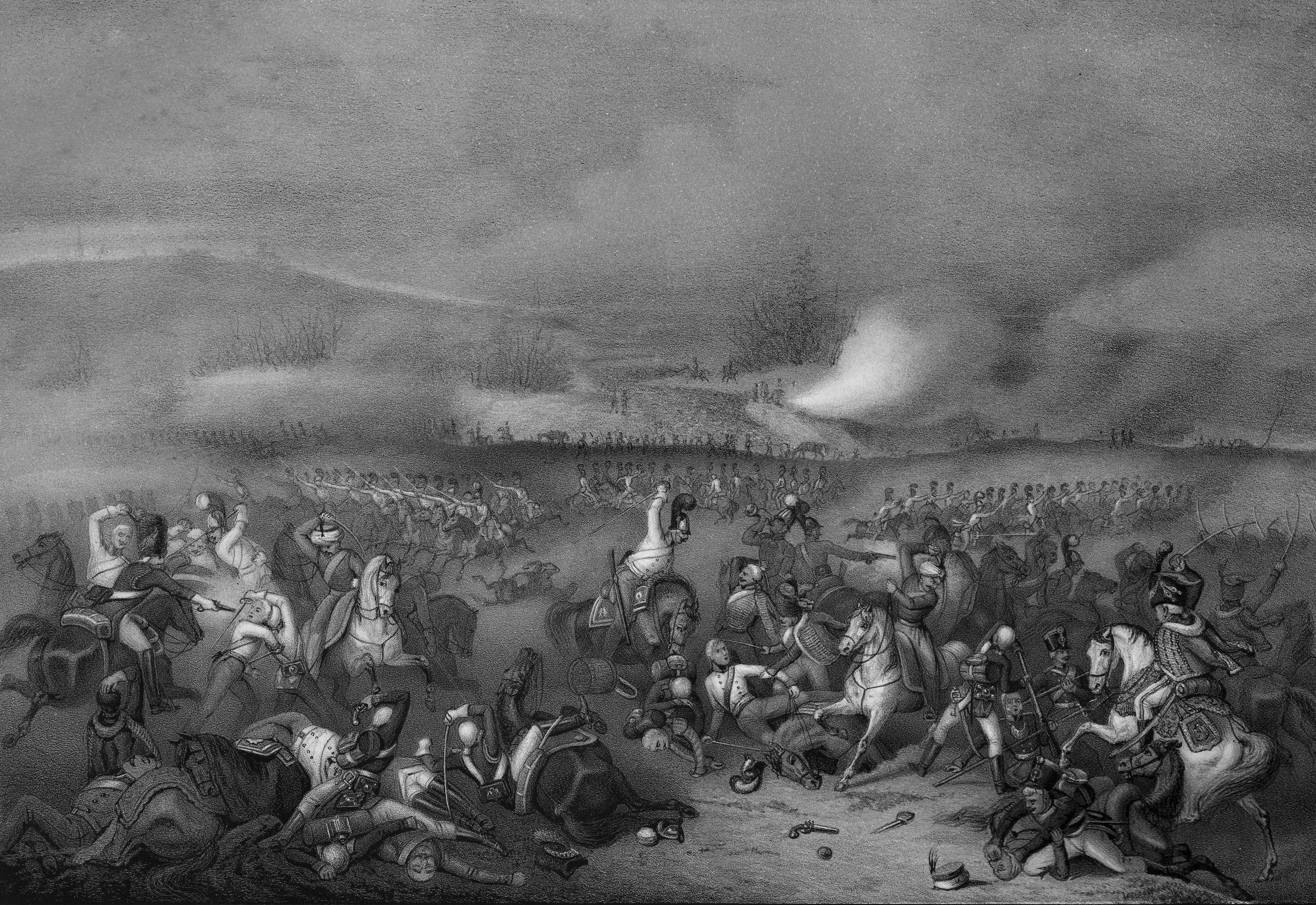
- Chevalier Guard Regiment in the Battle of Austerlitz
- Active: 1800-1918
- Country: Russian Empire
- Branch: Russian Imperial Guard
- Type: Heavy cavalry
- Size: Regiment
- Part of: 1st Guard Cavalry division
- Garrison/HQ: St. Petersburg

The Chevalier Guard Regiment (Russian: Кавалергардский полк, romanized: Kavalergardskiy polk) was a Russian heavy cavalry guard regiment, created in 1800 by the reformation of the Chevalier Guard corps, itself created in 1764 by Catherine the Great. As other Russian heavy cavalry guard regiments (the Life-Guards Horse Regiment, His Majesty's Life-Guards Cuirassier Regiment, and Her Majesty's Life-Guards Cuirassier Regiment), the Chevalier Guards were equipped as cuirassiers (with some differences in uniform and equipment from army cuirassiers and other guard cuirassier regiments).

== Campaigns ==
- 1805 – The regiment first saw combat in the Battle of Austerlitz, in which it fought bravely, covering the retreat of units from the Preobrazhensky and Semenovsky Regiments of the Russian Imperial Guard infantry. The Chevalier Guards were countercharged and defeated by the French Horse Grenadiers of the Old Guard, who inflicted heavy casualties among the Russians.
- 1807 – Battle of Heilsberg
- 1812 – The regiment distinguished itself during the Patriotic War of 1812. The Chevalier Guards lost their colonel early in the Battle of Borodino but, in concert with the Life Guard Horse Regiment, effectively stopped the decisive charge of Saxon cuirassier regiments and defeated French Horse Carabiniers.
- 1813 – Lützen, Kulm, Leipzig
- 1814 – Fère-Champenoise
- 1831 – Polish Campaign
- 1914 – First World War

The regiment was disbanded in 1918.

Many famous men served as Chevalier Guards including Georges-Charles de Heeckeren d'Anthès, Grigory Potemkin, Denis Davydov, Mikhail Skobelev, Alexander Rodzyanko, Pavlo Skoropadskyi, Carl Gustaf Emil Mannerheim and Alexander Ypsilantis.

== Gallery ==
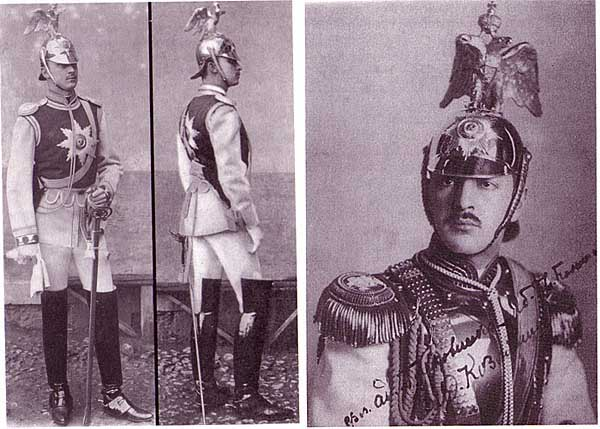
Officers of the Chevalier Guard. In left (1–2) is Gustaf Mannerheim

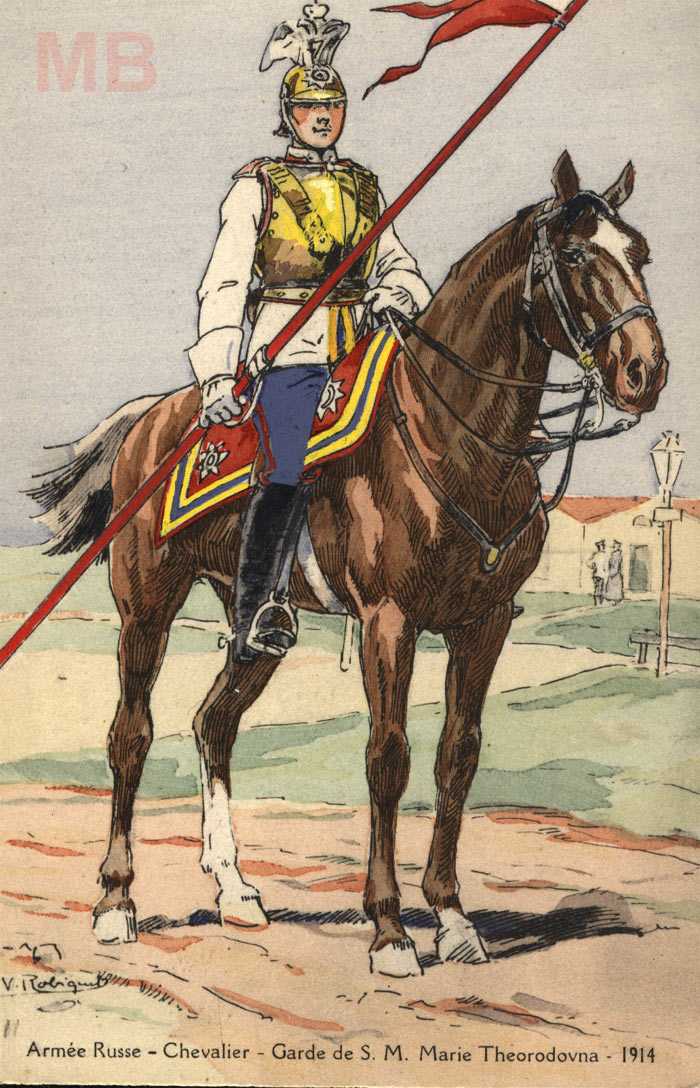
Military uniform, 1914. Her Majesty Empress Marie Theorodovna Chevalier Guards regiment

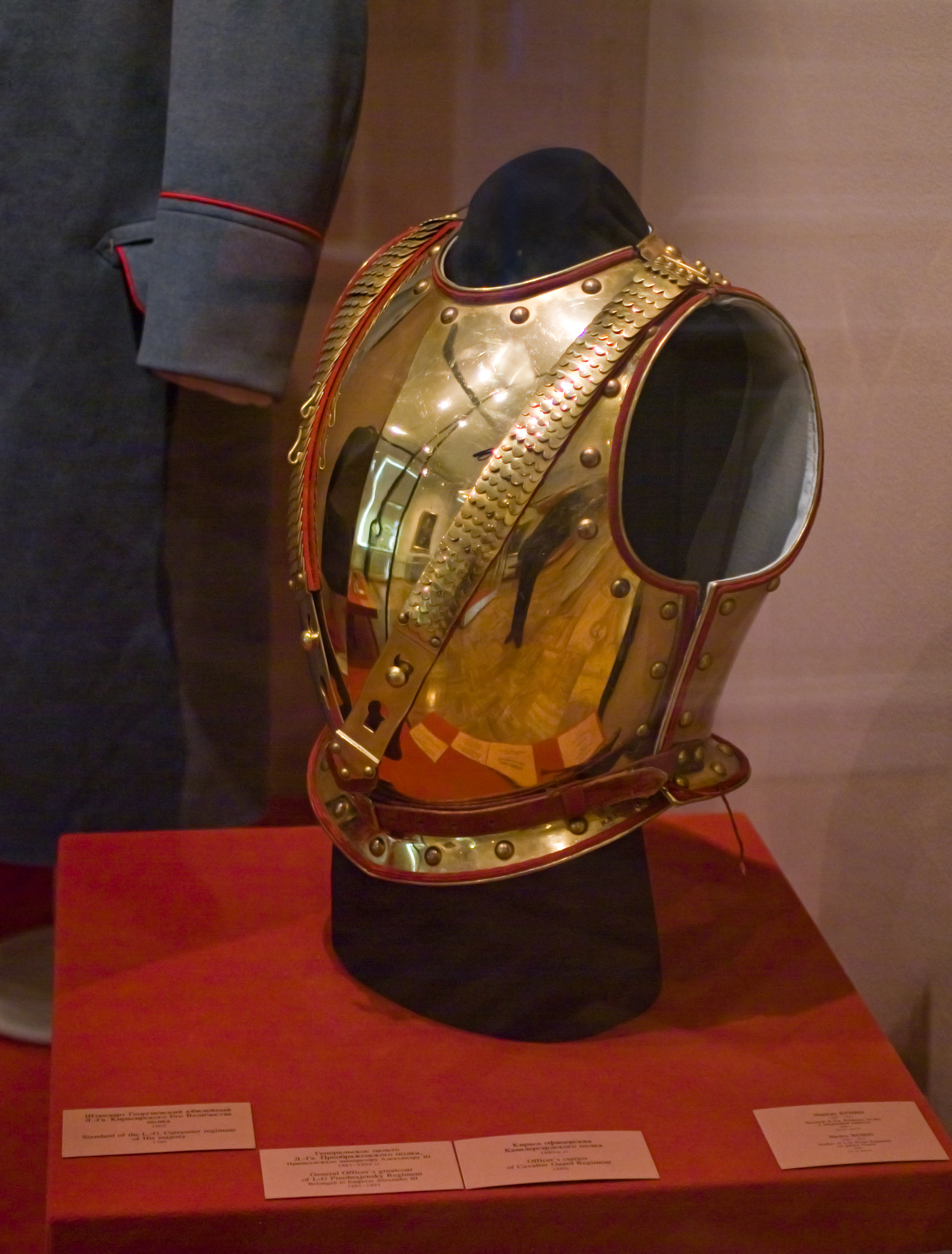
Officer's cuirass from the Chevalier Guard Regiment, 1880

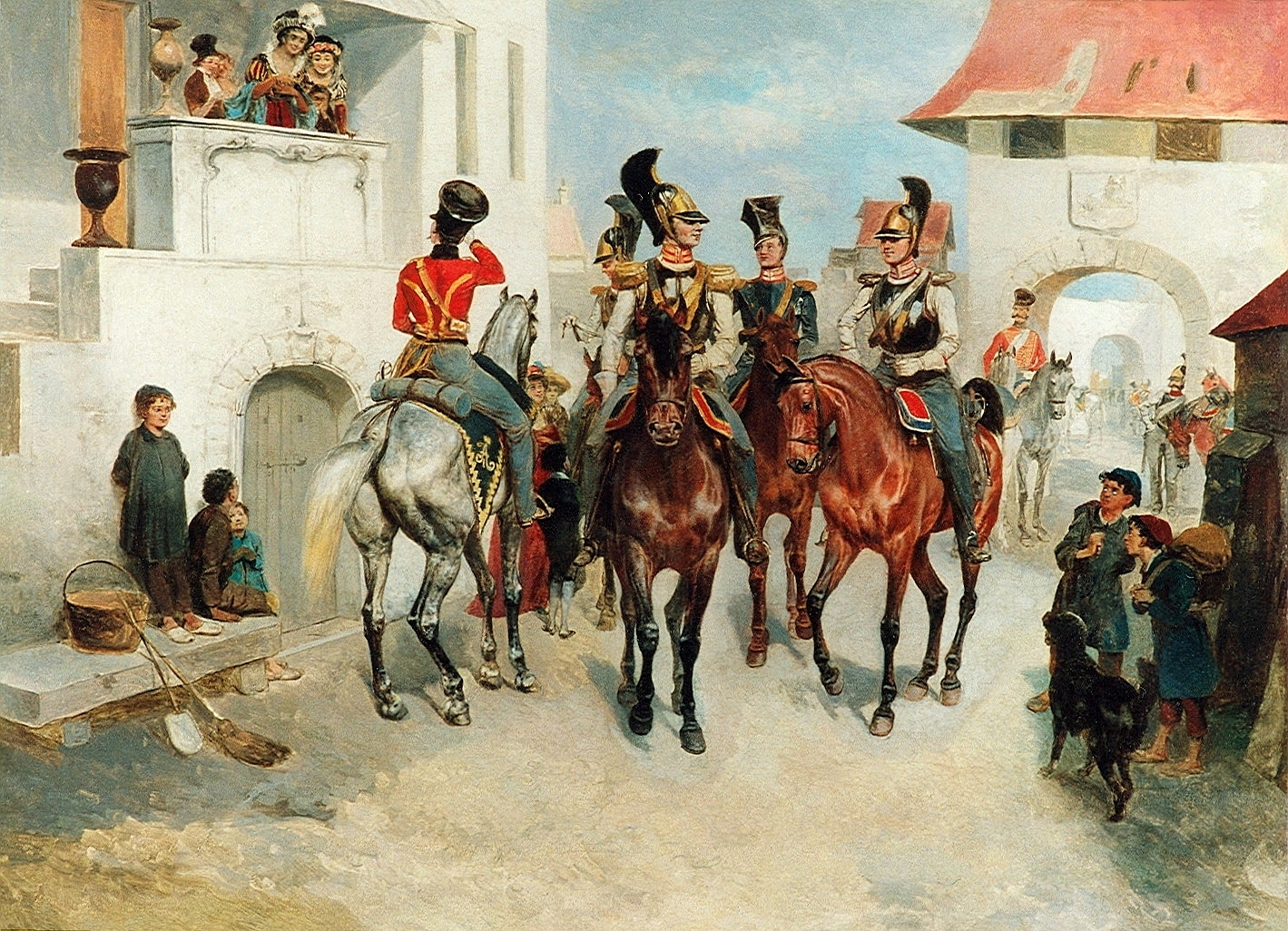
This painting by Bogdan Willewalde depicts the meeting of officers of the Russian Guards cavalry with the residents of one of the European cities in 1813–1814. It depicts (left - right) officer of the Life Guards Hussar Regiment, chief- and staff officers of the Life Guards Horse Regiment, chief-officers of the Life Guards Uhlan and Chevalier Guard Regiments. In the background can be seen the lower ranks of the Life Guards Hussar and one of the Army Cuirassier Regiments.
