= Huis te Ruurlo =

Castle in Gelderland, the Netherlands

- Ruurlo, Gelderland, the Netherlands
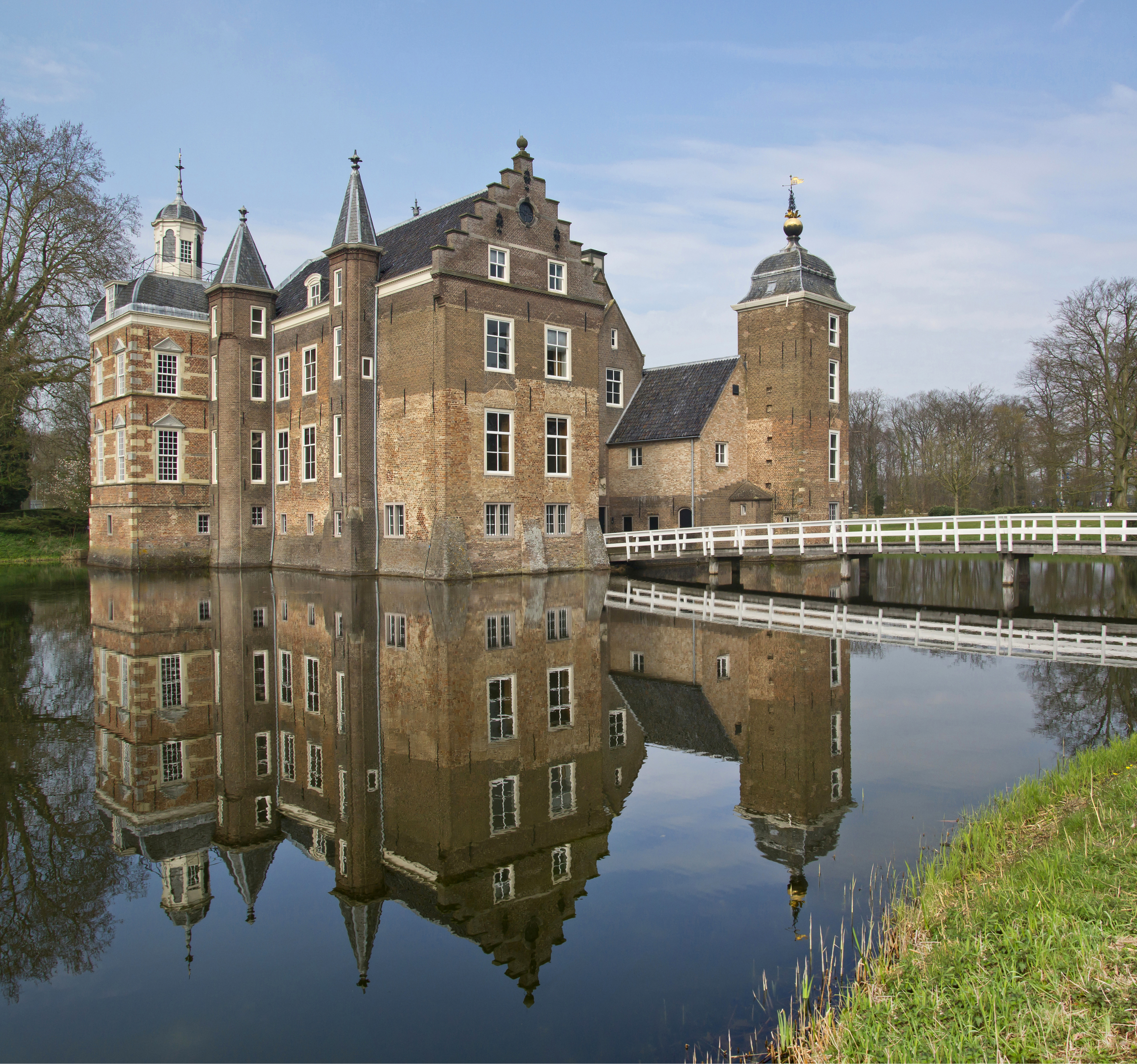
- Huis te Ruurlo

Site information
- Type: Castle
- Owner: Hans Melchers
- Open to the public: yes
- Condition: Good

Location
- The Netherlands
- Coordinates: 52.078861°N 6.445053°E

Huis te Ruurlo is a castle in Ruurlo, Gelderland, the Netherlands.

Huis te Ruurlo was mentioned in 1326 and has been in the hands of the Dutch noble Van Heeckeren family since the 15th century.

== See also ==
- List of castles in the Netherlands
