= In Search for Captain Grant =

- DVD cover
- Based on: In Search of the Castaways by Jules Verne
- Screenplay by: Stanislav Govorukhin
- Directed by: Stanislav Govorukhin
- Starring: Lembit Ulfsak; Nikolai Yeremenko Jr. Vladimir Gostyukhin; Oleg Stefan
- Theme music composer: Isaak Dunayevsky; Maksim Dunayevsky; Igor Kantyukov
- Countries of origin: Soviet Union; Bulgaria
- Original languages: Russian, Bulgarian
- No. of episodes: 7

Production
- Producer: Gemila Panibrat
- Cinematography: Timur Zelma
- Editors: Dobrina Minova; Valentina Oleynik
- Running time: 448 minutes
- Production companies: Odessa Film Studio; Boyana Film

Original release
- Network: Soviet CT Programme One; BNT 1
- Release: May 13 – May 21, 1986

In Search for Captain Grant (Russian: «В поисках капитана Гранта», Bulgarian: По следите на капитан Грант) is a 1986 Soviet seven-episode television miniseries adaptation of Jules Verne's 1868 novel In Search of the Castaways directed by Stanislav Govorukhin. It was shot at the Odessa Film Studio and Bulgaria's Boyana Film in 1985.

== Plot ==
The film consists of two subplots. The first tells about the life of the writer Jules Verne and the history of creation and publication of the novel In Search of the Castaways. The second actually narrates the novel.

Lord and Lady Glenarvan found in the sea a bottle with a letter from Captain Grant, whose ship was wrecked. After the refusal of the British government to conduct searches, The Glenarvans decide to find Captain Grant themselves with Grant's children Mary and Robert.

== Cast ==
- Vladimir Smirnov as Jules Verne
- Marina Vlady as Marko Vovchok
- Lembit Ulfsak as Jacques Paganel
- Nikolai Yeremenko Jr. as Lord Glenarvan
- Tamara Akulova as Lady Glenarvan
- Vladimir Gostyukhin as Major McNabbs
- Oleg Stefan as Capt. John Mangles
- Ruslan Kurashov as Robert Grant
- Galina Strutinskaya as Mary Grant
- Anatoli Rudakov as Olbinett
- Boris Khmelnitsky as Captain Grant
- Kosta Tsonev as Hetzel
- Aleksandr Abdulov as Bob the Tar
- Fyodor Odinokov as Paddy O'Moore

== Filming locations ==
- The film scenes were filmed mostly around the Black Sea region in Bulgaria, Crimea
- The initial scene with the hot air balloon was filmed near the city of Rylsk, Russian SFSR
- Part of the crossing of Patagonia was staged at Belogradchik Rocks near Belogradchik, Bulgaria and the Caucasus near the town of Dombay, Russian SFSR
- Ship scenes were filmed on several ships including the German-built barque Tovarisch, the Finnish-built schooners Kodor, and Zarya.

== List of episodes ==
1. With Jules Verne around the World (Russian: С Жюль Верном вокруг Света)
2. The 37th parallel (Russian: 37 параллель)
3. Talkaw (Russian: Талькав)
4. The Golden God (Russian: Золотой бог)
5. Ben Joyce (Russian: Бен Джойс)
6. Imprisoned by cannibals (Russian: В плену у каннибалов)
7. Robinson of Oceania (Russian: Робинзон Океании)
