= In Search of the Castaways =

1867–1868 novel by Jules Verne

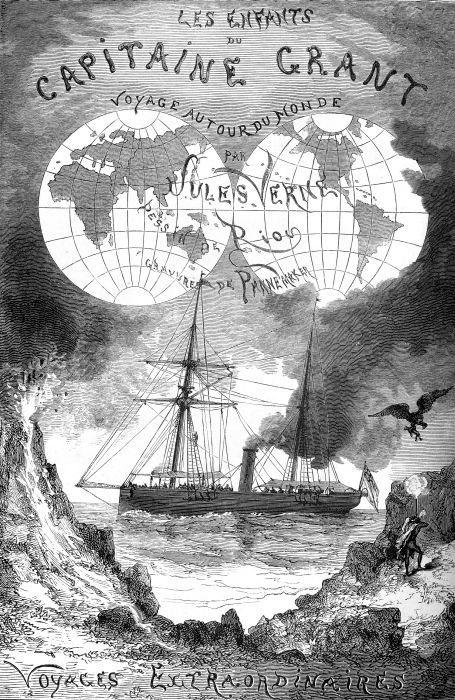
- Frontispiece of the original edition
- Author: Jules Verne
- Original title: Les Enfants du capitaine Grant
- Illustrator: Édouard Riou
- Language: French
- Series: The Extraordinary Voyages #5
- Genre: Adventure novel
- Publisher: Pierre-Jules Hetzel
- Publication date: 1867–1868
- Publication place: France
- English publication date: 1873
- Media type: Print (Hardback)
- Preceded by: From the Earth to the Moon
- Followed by: Twenty Thousand Leagues Under the Seas
- Text: In Search of the Castaways at Wikisource

In Search of the Castaways (French: Les Enfants du capitaine Grant, lit. 'The Children of Captain Grant') is a novel by the French writer Jules Verne, published in 1867–1868. It follows the adventurous search for a missing ship captain after a message from him is found in a bottle. The novel has been published in English translation with several different titles including A Voyage Round The World and Captain Grant's Children. The first edition, published by Hetzel, contains illustrations by Édouard Riou.

== Synopsis ==
After finding a message in a bottle in the ocean from Captain Grant whose ship the Britannia has been wrecked, Lord and Lady Glenarvan of Scotland contact the young daughter and son of Grant, Mary and Robert, through an announcement in a newspaper. The government refuses to launch a rescue expedition, but Lord and Lady Glenarvan, moved by the children's condition, decide to do it by themselves. The main difficulty is that the coordinates of the wreckage are mostly erased, and only the latitude (37 degrees) is known; thus, the expedition would have to circumnavigate the 37th parallel south. The bottle was retrieved from a shark's stomach, so it is impossible to trace its origin by the currents. Remaining clues consist of a few words in three languages. They are re-interpreted several times throughout the novel to make various destinations seem likely like Chile, Argentina, Southern Tip of Australia, at some times New Zealand and even the northernmost part of Antarctica (to which they never sailed).

Lord Glenarvan makes it his quest to find Grant; together with his wife, Grant's children and the crew of his yacht, the Duncan, they set off for South America. An unexpected passenger in the form of French geographer Jacques Paganel (he missed his steamer to India by accidentally boarding the Duncan) joins the search. They explore Patagonia, Tristan da Cunha Island, Amsterdam Island, and Australia (a pretext to describe the flora, fauna, and geography of numerous places to the audience).

There, they find a former quartermaster of the Britannia, Ayrton, who proposes to lead them to the site of the wreckage. However, Ayrton is a traitor, who was not present during the loss of the Britannia, but was abandoned in Australia after a failed attempt to seize control of the ship to practise piracy. He tries to take control of the Duncan, but by sheer luck, this attempt also fails. However the Glenarvans, the Grant children, Paganel and some sailors are left in Australia, and mistakenly believing that the Duncan is lost, they sail to Auckland, New Zealand, from where they want to come back to Europe. When their ship is wrecked south of Auckland on the New Zealand coast, they are captured by a Māori tribe, but luckily manage to escape and board a ship that they discover, to their astonishment, to be the Duncan.

Ayrton, made a prisoner, offers to trade his knowledge of Captain Grant in exchange for being abandoned on a desert island instead of being surrendered to the British authorities. The Duncan sets sail for Tabor Island, which, by sheer luck, turns out to be Captain Grant's shelter. They leave Ayrton in his place to live among the beasts and regain his humanity.

Ayrton reappears in Verne's later novel, L'Île mystérieuse (The Mysterious Island, 1874).

== Publication History ==
The title of the original French edition, published by Hetzel in 1865, is «Les enfants du captaine Grant». The work has 70 chapters across three parts (or volumes, depending on publisher). The parts in French editions do not have individual titles.

The work has been translated into other languages including English, Estonian, Czech, Polish, Russian and Swedish.

=== English Translations ===
As has often happened with Verne's books, English translations have appeared under a number of different titles. The modern unabridged English translation is done by Don Sample.

- 1874 - In Search of the Castaways, published by J. B. Lippincott & Co. (60 chapters).
- 1876–77 - A Voyage Round the World, published by George Routledge & Sons, in three volumes South America, Australia and New Zealand (70 chapters). Evans considers this to be the best of the 19th century translations.
- 1911 - In Search of the Castaways or The children of Captain Grant, published in The Works of Jules Verne, ed. Charles F. Horne. This is not an original translation, but a heavily abridged version of the Routledge translation (66 chapters). This version circulates widely on the internet, and is often used by modern publishers.
- 1964 - Captain Grant's Children, published by Ward, Lock & Co., 1876. In three volumes, with titles The Mysterious Document, On the Track, and Among the Cannibals. Abridged version in two volumes (ARCO, ed. I. O. Evans, 1964)
- 2018-2019 - The Children of Captain Grant: A Journey Around the World In Search of The Castaways. Modern unabridged translation by Don Sample, released for free on the internet under a Creative Commons license. It claims to be more faithful and complete than other translations. 70 chapters.

== Adaptations ==
- 1877: Los sobrinos del capitán Grant ("Captain Grant's nephew and niece"), a three-act, spectacular Spanish zarzuela by Manuel Fernández Caballero to a text by Miguel Ramos Carrión.
- 1914: Les enfants du capitaine Grant, a French silent film and the last film Victorin-Hippolyte Jasset worked on before his untimely death.
- 1936: The Children of Captain Grant (Дети капитана Гранта, Deti kapitana Granta), Soviet Union, directed by Vladimir Vajnshtok and starring Nikolai Cherkasov, film score composed by Isaak Dunayevsky. The film was released in the United States as Captain Grant's Children. (see Deti kapitana Granta at IMDb).
- 1962: In Search of the Castaways, United States, a film directed by Robert Stevenson and starring Maurice Chevalier, Hayley Mills, and George Sanders. Songs by the Sherman Brothers were: "Castaway", "Enjoy It!", "Let's Climb", "Merci Beaucoup". (see In Search of the Castaways at IMDb).
- 1985: In Search of Captain Grant (В поисках капитана Гранта, V poiskakh kapitana Granta, Децата на капитан Грант), Bulgaria and the Soviet Union, a TV miniseries directed by Stanislav Govorukhin and starring Nikolai Yeryomenko, Jr., Lembit Ulfsak, Aleksandr Abdulov, Kosta Tsonev, and Anya Pencheva.

== Maps ==
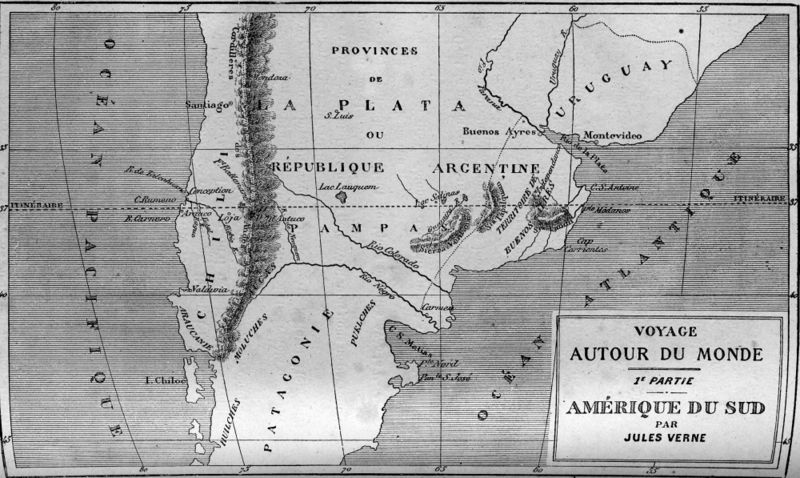

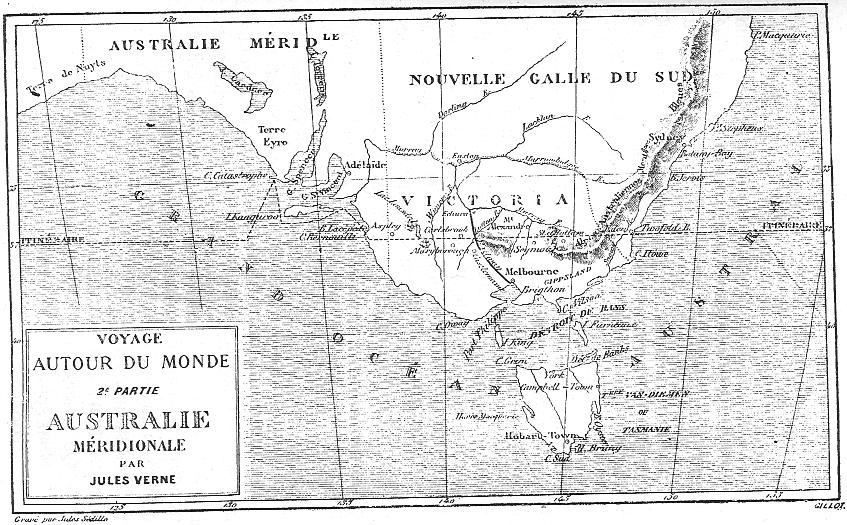

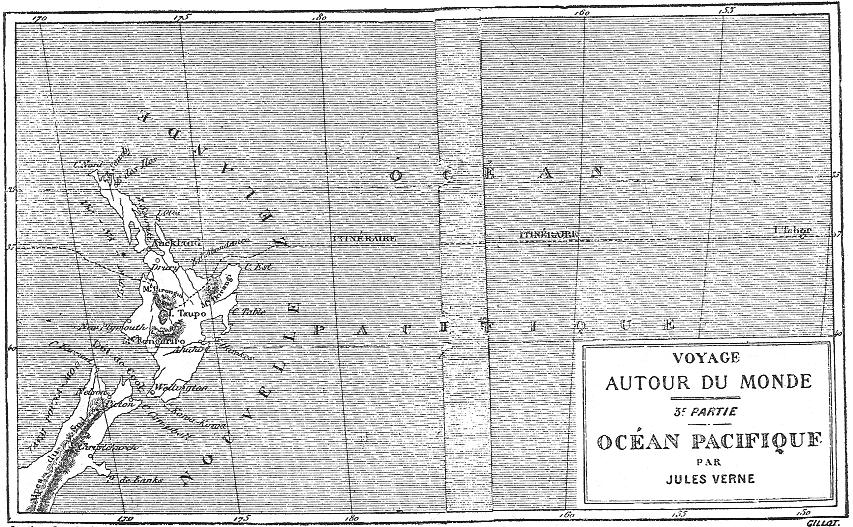

3 maps showing The Duncan's crew's search in Chile, Argentina, Australia and New Zealand.
