= Jacob van Heeckeren tot Enghuizen =

Dutch diplomat (1792–1884)

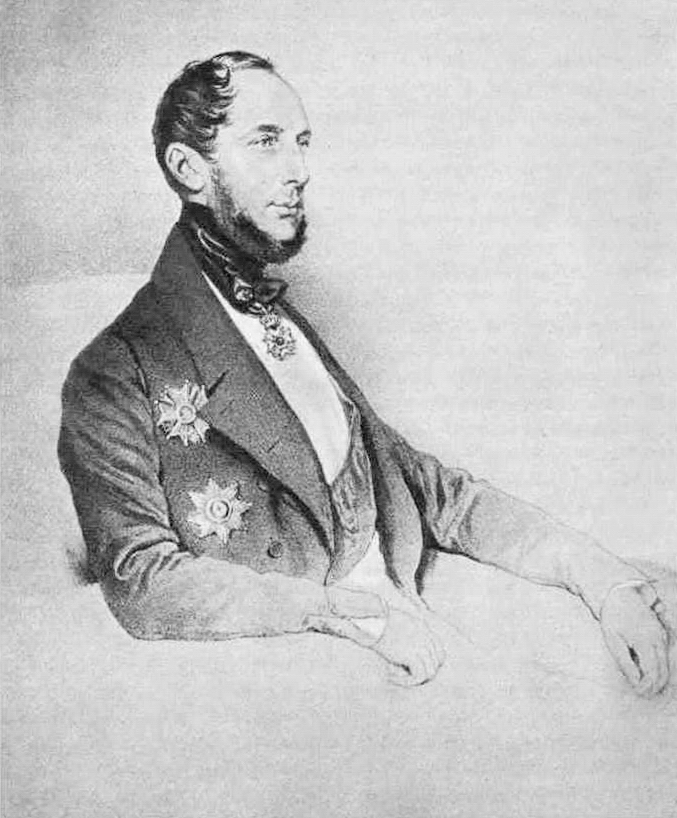
Portrait by Josef Kriehuber, 1843

Jacob Derk Burchard Anne, Baron van Heeckeren tot Enghuizen, also known as Baron van Heeckeren van Beverweerd (28 November 1792 – 28 September 1884), was a Dutch diplomat. He received the title baron of the First French Empire in 1813.

== Life ==
Van Heeckeren was born in Zutphen in the Netherlands, the son of Evert Frederik baron van Heeckeren van Enghuizen, a Dutch major and courtier, and Henriette Johanna Susanna Maria des H.R.R. Countess of Nassau-la Lecq, one of nine children.

Van Heeckeren’s first post was as an officer in the Dutch Navy, stationed in Toulon. Later he was employed by Napoleon, who awarded him the title Baron de l'Empire. It was about this time that van Heeckeren converted to Catholicism. For the Dutch government, Van Heeckeren was successively secretary of the legation at Lisbon (1814), Stockholm (1815–1817) and Berlin (1817 - 1822). In 1822 Van Heeckeren was the acting agent for the Dutch in St. Petersburg. From 1823 to May 1837 he was ambassador extraordinary and minister plenipotentiary to the court in St. Petersburg. From June 1842 to October 1875 he was ambassador extraordinary and minister plenipotentiary to the court in Vienna.

Van Heeckeren was unmarried, but did not want his name to die with him. In St. Petersburg he came to know Georges d'Anthès, an officer in the Russian army and the son of a noble landowner in the French Alsace. After several letters and a visit to Georges’s father, Joseph Conrad d'Anthès, Jacob van Heeckeren requested that he be allowed to adopt Georges, giving him his name and the right to inherit his property. The old Baron d'Anthès accepted the offer, and, after the agreement of the King of the Netherlands by letters patent dated May 5, 1836, Georges-Charles d'Anthès took the name of Georges-Charles de Heeckeren d'Anthès. Writers have suggested that the relationship between Jacob and Georges was more than that of adoptive father-son. After Georges d'Anthès’s duel with the poet Alexander Pushkin (who died from injuries), Jacob was recalled from St. Petersburg.

Van Heeckeren tot Enghuizen was a Knight Grand Cross of the Order of the Netherlands Lion, and was a bearer of the Grand Cross of the Order of the Oak Crown, awarded 25 August 1863.

From 14 July 1872 until his death he was Minister of State for the Netherlands, an honorary title given to the country's most prominent retired politicians or civil servants. Van Heeckeren died in Paris.
