= Georges-Charles de Heeckeren d'Anthès =

French military officer and politician (1812–1895)

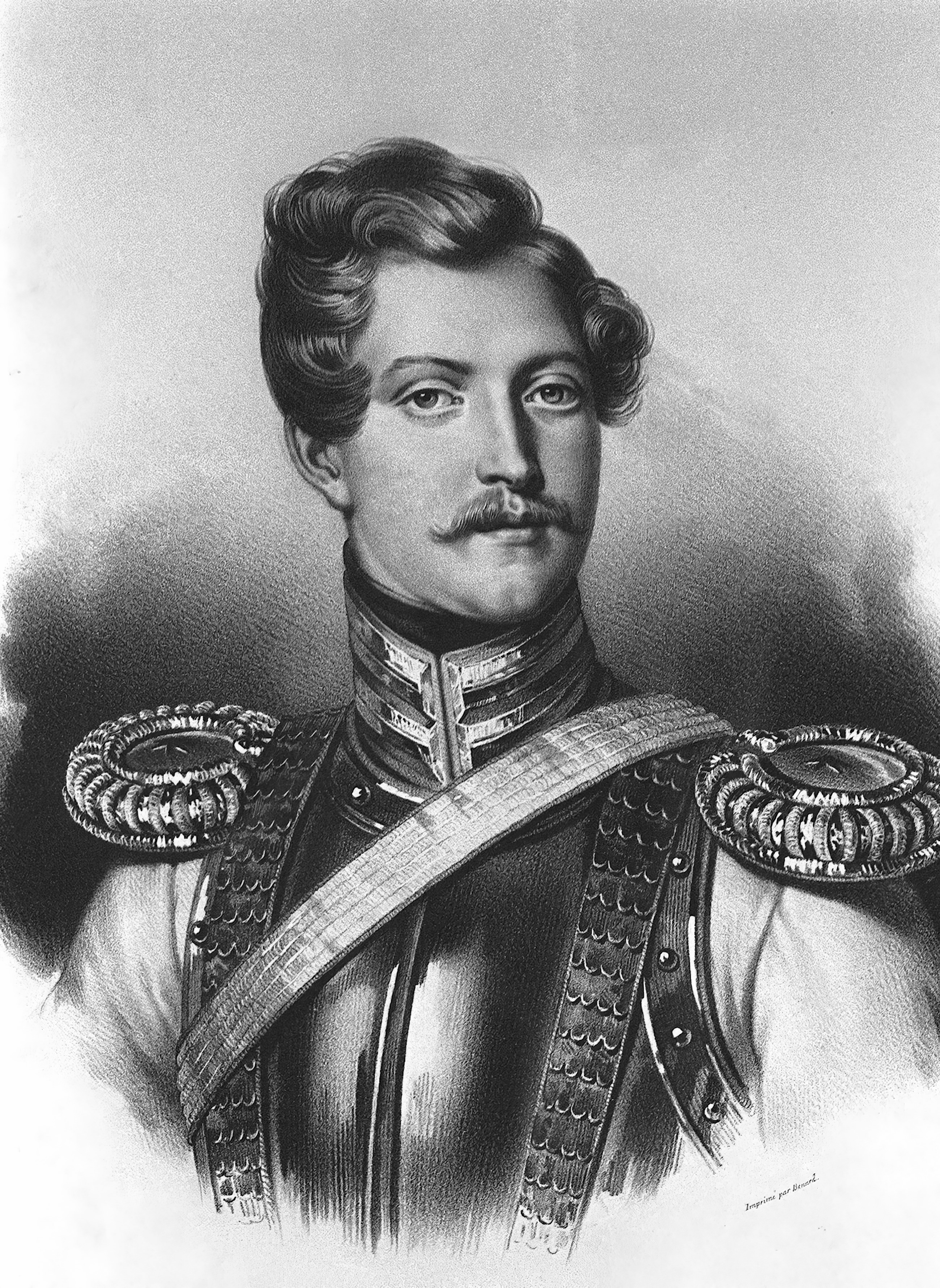
- Georges-Charles d'Anthès (1830)

Senator of Second French Empire
- In office 27 March 1852 – 4 September 1870
- Monarch: Napoleon III

Member of National Constitutional Assembly of Second Republic
- In office 23 Aprel 1848 – 23 May 1849
- President: Charles-Louis Napoléon Bonaparte

Member of National Legislative Assembly of Second Republic
- In office 13 May 1849 – 2 December 1851
- President: Charles-Louis Napoléon Bonaparte

Personal details
- Born: Georges-Charles d'Anthès; 5 February 1812 Colmar, First French Empire
- Died: 2 November 1895 (aged 83) Soultz-Haut-Rhin, German Empire (modern day France)
- Spouse: Catherine Gontcharoff
- Education: Lycée Condorcet
- Awards: Legion of Honour

Military service
- Allegiance: First French Empire; Kingdom of France; July Monarchy; French Second Republic; Second French Empire; French Third Republic
- Branch/service: Chevalier Guard Regiment
- Years of service: 1834—1837
- Rank: Poruchnik

Baron Georges-Charles de Heeckeren d'Anthès (born Georges-Charles d'Anthès; 5 February 1812 – 2 November 1895) was a French military officer and politician. Despite his later career as a senator under the Second French Empire, d'Anthès is mostly known for fatally wounding the Russian poet Alexander Pushkin in a duel in 1837.

== Career ==
Born in Colmar to aristocratic Alsatian parents, the first boy among six children, he was destined for a military career. He was therefore sent to Saint-Cyr, the premier French military academy, and, in 1830, as cavalry officer, he supported Charles X's party during the July Revolution. After the exile of Charles X, d'Anthès refused to serve under the July Monarchy, resigned from the army and withdrew to his father's home in Alsace.

As he was authorized by the French government to serve abroad without losing his nationality, he set off first for Prussia, then for Russia. In St. Petersburg, he succeeded in entering the Knights Guards of the Empress as cornet. Two years later, in 1836, he became lieutenant.

His family ties and good looks gave him access to St. Petersburg high society. It was there that he met the Dutch plenipotentiary to the court, Baron Heeckeren, who, after a lengthy correspondence and a journey to Alsace, proposed to d'Anthès's father that he adopt his son as his own heir. After the agreement of the King of the Netherlands, Georges-Charles d'Anthès took the name of Georges-Charles de Heeckeren d'Anthès.

According to a booklet written by Prince A. Trubetskoy: "...d'Anthès was known for his antics, quite inoffensive and appropriate to youths except the one, of which we learnt much later. I don't know what to say: whether he took Heeckeren or Heeckeren took him [...] All in all, [...] in the intercourse with Heeckeren he was ever a passive partner."

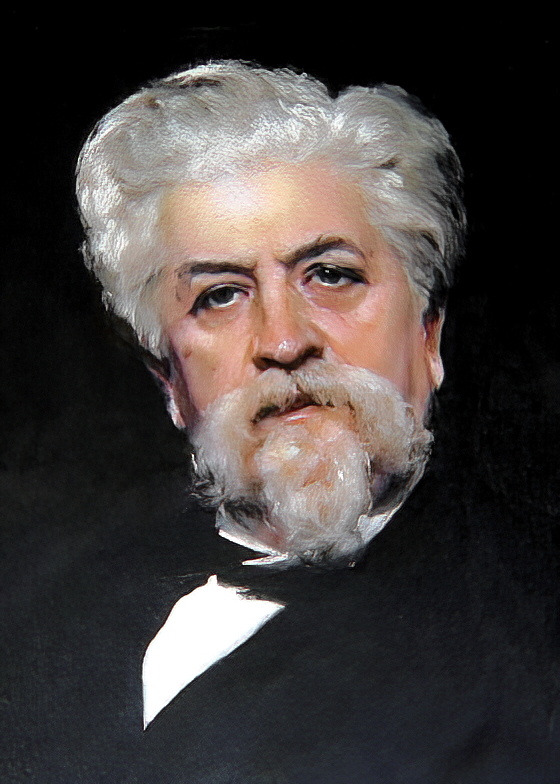
Baron Georges d'Anthès in later life, after he had retired from politics (1878)

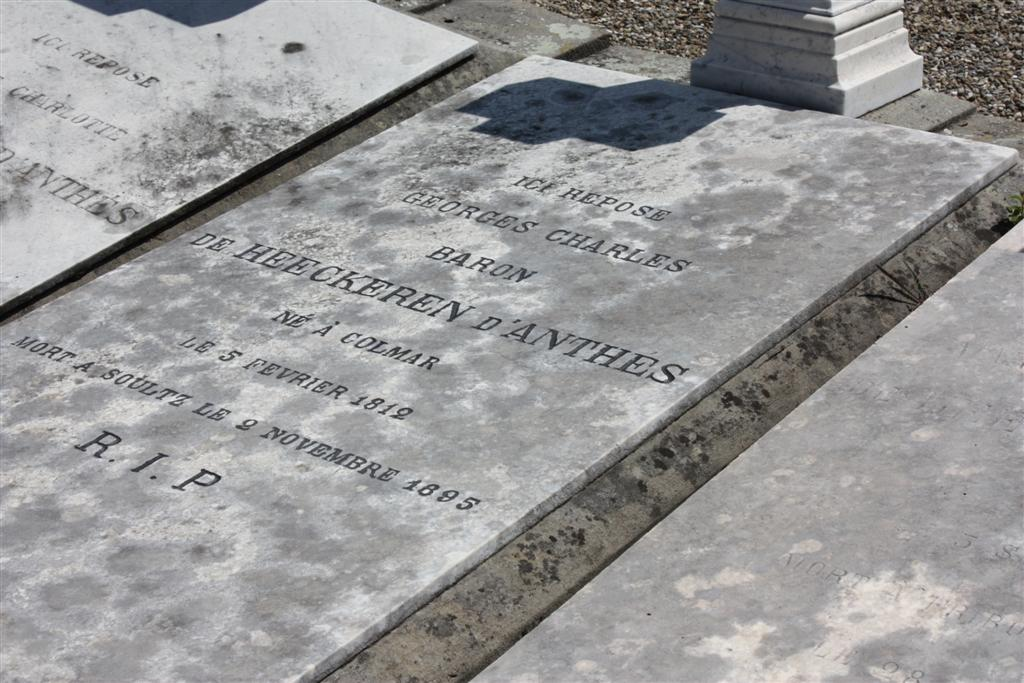
D'Anthès' grave. Soultz. June 2009

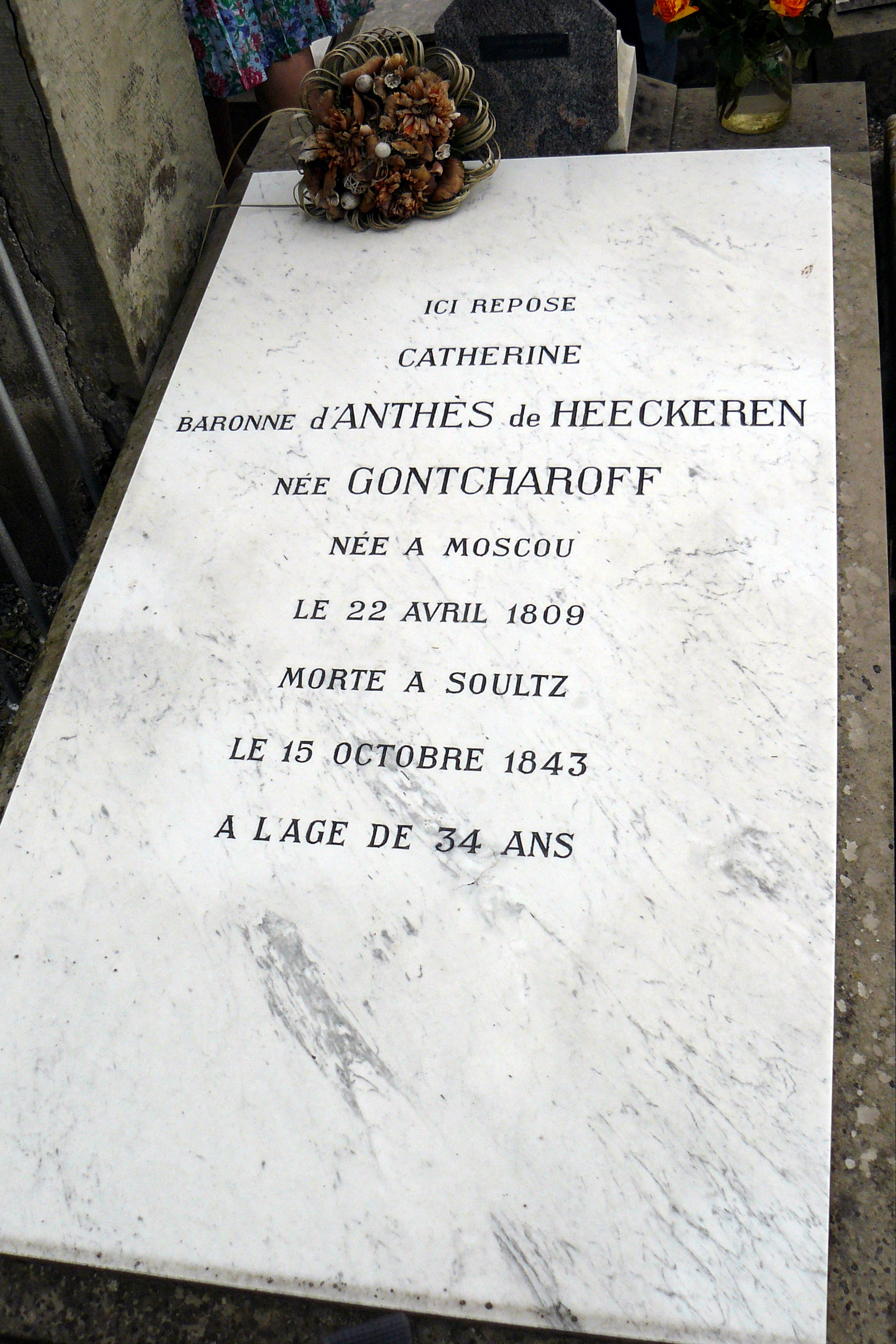
Grave of Yekaterina Goncharova

D'Anthès met Pushkin and his wife, Natalia, a beautiful and flirtatious young woman who had many admirers. In the beginning, Pushkin took to d'Anthès amicably, yet the latter chose to court Natalia, and in a compromising way. Soon after, a number of Pushkin's closest friends, as well as Pushkin himself, received copies of an anonymous lampoon on Pushkin. The lampoon was a mock letter awarding Pushkin the title of Deputy Grand Master and Historiographer of the Order of Cuckolds. Pushkin accused Heeckeren of being the lampoon's author, though the true author has never been established. Expert research ruled out Heeckeren authorship as the lampoon (written in French) contained errors extremely unlikely for a native speaker, and such authorship would have been too risky for a diplomat. In the complicated affair that ensued, D'Anthès married Natalia's sister, Yekaterina Goncharova, on 10 January 1837. It has been suggested that d'Anthès's engagement and marriage to Natalia's sister was devised to contradict society gossip that he was in pursuit of Natalia. In any event, this was not enough to settle the conflict between the two new brothers-in-law. After marrying Yekaterina, D'Anthès continued to behave provocatively with Natalia, instigating a new duel challenge.

On the evening of 27 January 1837, d'Anthès fired first, mortally wounding Pushkin in the stomach. Pushkin, who had fought several duels, managed to rise and shoot at d'Anthès, but only wounded him lightly in the right arm. As he lay on his deathbed, Pushkin sent a message to d'Anthès pardoning him of any wrongdoing. Pushkin died two days later, after which d'Anthès was imprisoned at Peter and Paul Fortress in St. Petersburg. Dueling was illegal in Russia, and d'Anthès was called to court, but he was pardoned by the Emperor. Stripped of his rank, he was escorted back to the frontier and ordered to leave Russia permanently. In Berlin, he was joined by his wife, and the couple returned to France, in his father's region.

There he began a successful political career: as first president of the local assembly, then member of the National Constituent Assembly from 1848 to 1852, and, at last, senator for life from 1852 to 1870. After the Franco-Prussian War and the collapse of the Second Empire, he retired from politics and withdrew to his ancestral home in Soultz-Haut-Rhin (soon to be annexed to the German Empire and renamed to Sulz/Oberelsaß). As an Alsatian, he was given the opportunity to choose between French and German citizenship; he chose to remain a Frenchman.

His wife died on 15 October 1843 while giving birth to their fourth child. He died on 2 November 1895, aged 83, surrounded by his children and grandchildren, at his family house in Sulz, Alsace-Lorraine, Germany. Obituaries appeared in Journal des débats, Le Figaro, and Le Temps, which highlighted his duel with Pushkin almost sixty years earlier, but little mention was made of his political career.

== Sources ==
- "Дантес, д'Антес, Георг Карл" . Brockhaus and Efron Encyclopedic Dictionary (in Russian). 1906.
- Biography: Baron Georges Charles d'Anthès de Heeckeren
