= Jacques Paganel =

Fictional character created by Jules Verne

- Voyages Extraordinaires character
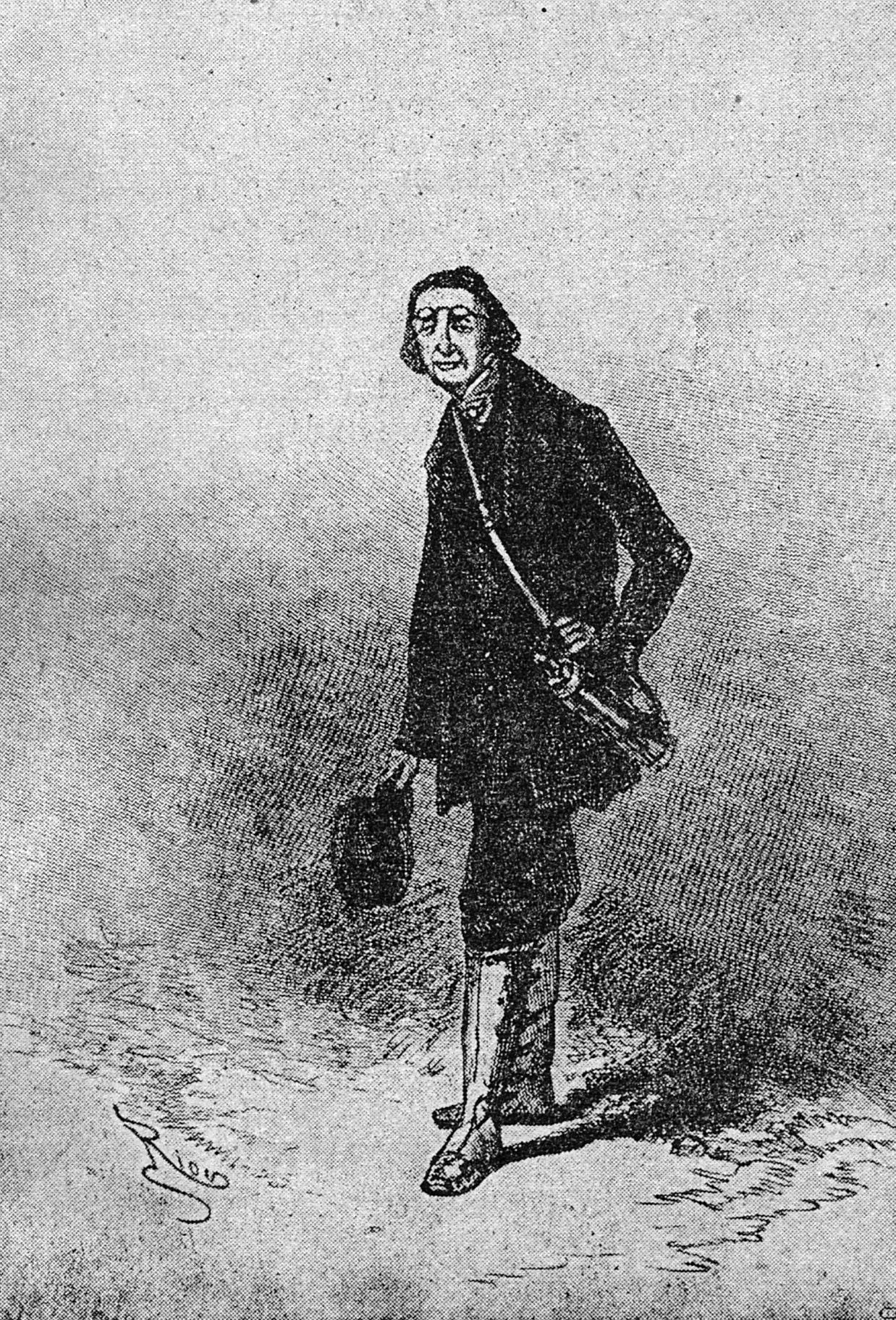
- Jacques Paganel by Édouard Riou (1868)
- Created by: Jules Verne

In-universe information
- Gender: Male
- Occupation: Geographer
- Nationality: French

Jacques Eliacin François Marie Paganel is a fictional French geographer and one of the main characters in Jules Verne's 1867–68 novel In Search of the Castaways (original title Les Enfants du capitaine Grant). Paganel is portrayed as an absent-minded scholar, and his absent-mindedness is a recurring source of humor in the novel.

Verne gives a memorable characterisation of his hero:

He was a tall, thin, withered-looking man, about forty years of age, and resembled a long nail with a big head. His head was large and massive, his forehead high, his chin very marked. His eyes were concealed by enormous round spectacles, and in his look was that peculiar indecision which is common to nyctalopes, or people who have a peculiar construction of the eye, which makes the sight imperfect in the day and better at night. It was evident from his physiognomy that he was a lively, intelligent man; he had not the crabbed expression of those grave individuals who never laugh on principle, and cover their emptiness with a mask of seriousness. He looked far from that. His careless, good-humored air, and easy, unceremonious manners, showed plainly that he knew how to take men and things on their bright side. But though he had not yet opened his mouth, he gave one the impression of being a great talker, and moreover, one of those absent folks who neither see though they are looking, nor hear though they are listening. He wore a traveling cap, and strong, low, yellow boots with leather gaiters. His pantaloons and jacket were of brown velvet, and their innumerable pockets were stuffed with note-books, memorandum-books, account-books, pocket-books, and a thousand other things equally cumbersome and useless, not to mention a telescope in addition, which he carried in a shoulder-belt.

In the novel, Paganel is the "Secretary of the Geographical Society of Paris, Corresponding Member of the Societies of Berlin, Bombay, Darmstadt, Leipsic, London, St. Petersburg, Vienna, and New York; Honorary Member of the Royal Geographical and Ethnographical Institute of the East Indies". After spending twenty years engaged in geographical work in the study, he decides to travel to India to continue the work of major explorers, but mistakenly boards the protagonists' yacht Duncan, which is bound for Patagonia, the first of Paganel's absent-minded actions.

Another of Paganel's mistakes is to learn Portuguese while believing he is studying Spanish. Paganel studies The Lusiads by Luís de Camões for six weeks, believing the poem to be written in Spanish.

Nevertheless, Paganel proves to be an important member of the search party. His interpretation of the documents is vital in the advancement of the novel; he also provides numerous geographical references and is a constant source of humor.

== In film and television ==
Actors who have played Paganel on the screen include:

- Nikolai Cherkasov, in The Children of Captain Grant (1936)
- Maurice Chevalier, in In Search of the Castaways (1962)
- Lembit Ulfsak, in In Search of Captain Grant (1985)
