= Lord Glenarvan =

Fictional character in Jules Verne novels

Lord Edward Glenarvan
- Voyages Extraordinaires character
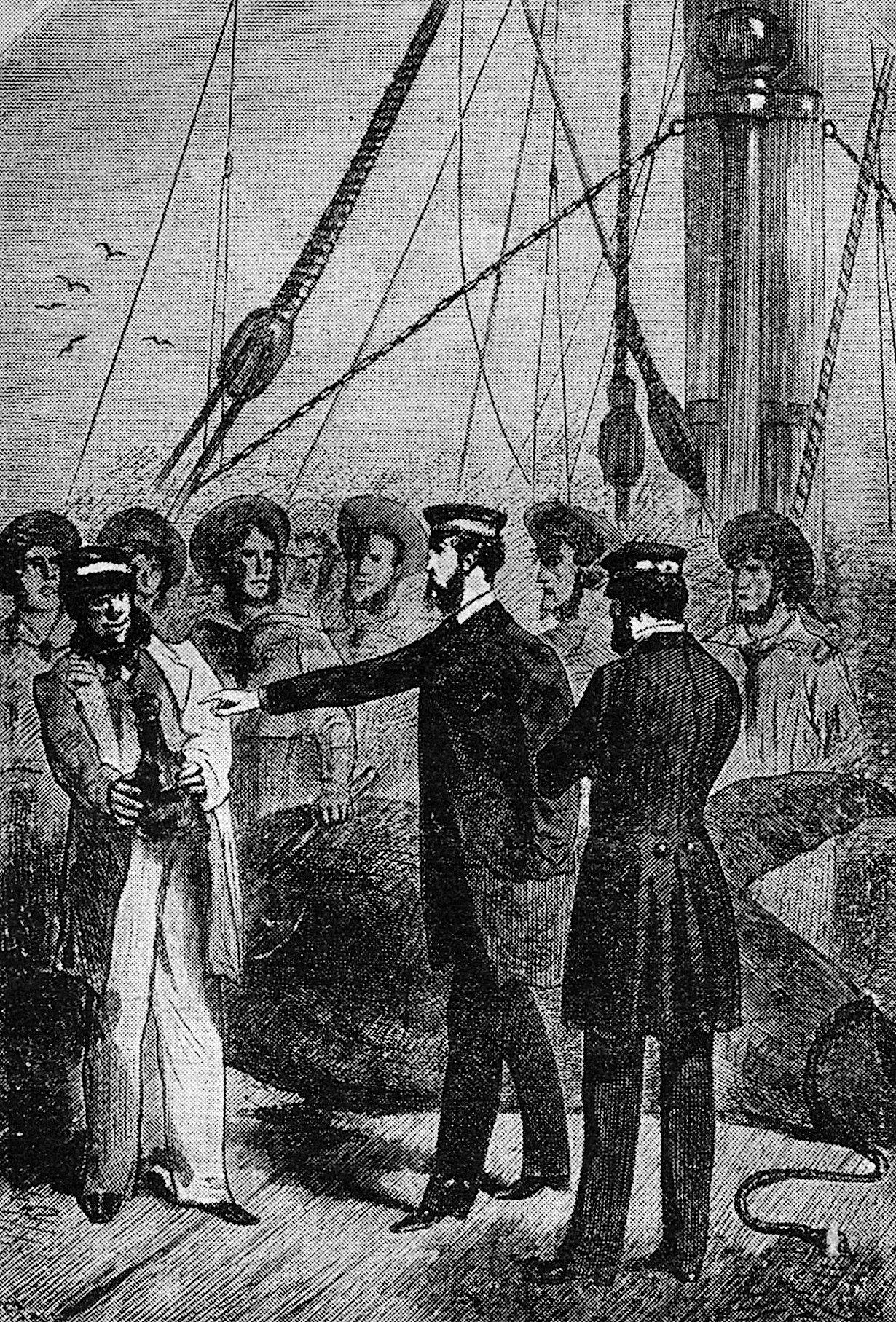
- Lord Glenarvan in Les Enfants du capitaine Grant
- First appearance: Les Enfants du capitaine Grant (1868)
- Last appearance: L'Île mystérieuse (1874)
- Created by: Jules Verne

In-universe information
- Gender: Male
- Family: wife Lady Helena; cousin Major MacNabb
- Nationality: Scottish

Lord Glenarvan is a fictional character that appears in Jules Verne's 1868 novel In Search of the Castaways and then briefly appears in The Mysterious Island (1875). He is a wealthy Scottish noble married to Lady Glenarvan.

== Fictional appearances ==
Lord Glenarvan owns a yacht called the Duncan, which he uses to help find Captain Grant of the Britannia, who is being sought by his children Robert and Mary. After many travels and misfortunes he and his crew eventually finds the captain in the conclusion of In Search of the Castaways.

In The Mysterious Island, Lord Glenarvan uses the Duncan to save castaways and the repentant criminal Tom Ayrton on the fictional Lincoln Island.

In Among the Cannibals, Lord Glenarvan threatens to kill his wife to prevent her from being taken captive by a group of Maori. Moffat interprets this scene as an example of the "European fear" of "the contamination and despoliation of pure and virtuous European women".

== Reception ==
The character has been used to discuss European colonialism in literature. Russian playwright Mikhail Bulgakov used the character in a 1928 comedy, The Crimson Island, as a spoof of Western European colonialism.

== See also ==
- Luss

== Sources ==
- Moffat, Kirstine (2011). "Five Imperial Adventures in the Waikato". Journal of New Zealand Literature (29): 37–65. ISSN 0112-1227. JSTOR 41410924.
