= List of giant squid specimens and sightings (2001–2014) =

A frame from the first colour film of a live giant squid in its natural habitat, (Note: The very first footage of a live giant squid in its natural habitat was a black-and-white video (#548) recorded about a week earlier during the same expedition.) recorded from a manned submersible off Japan's Ogasawara Islands in July 2012. The animal (#549 on this list) is seen feeding on a 1-metre-long Thysanoteuthis rhombus (diamondback squid), which was used as bait in conjunction with a flashing squid jig. The giant squid's silvery-metallic appearance came as a surprise to the expedition team, and had never been observed previously (stranded specimens invariably have reddish skin, if it is preserved at all).

This list of giant squid specimens and sightings from the 21st century is a comprehensive timeline of recent human encounters with members of the genus Architeuthis, popularly known as giant squid. It includes animals that were caught by fishermen, found washed ashore, recovered (in whole or in part) from sperm whales and other predatory species, as well as those reliably sighted at sea. The list also covers specimens incorrectly assigned to the genus Architeuthis in original descriptions or later publications.

== Background ==
Compilation of published coordinates for specimens from 2001–2014 (some may be subject to significant rounding error and even indicate inland locations) Download coordinates as: KML

The beginning of the 21st century marked a turning point in humanity's understanding of the life habits of the giant squid, as it ushered in the first visually documented and incontrovertible observations of live animals, both adult and paralarval. The quest to photograph or film a live giant squid—mooted since at least the 1960s (Note: In the summer of 1965, marine biologist Frederick Aldrich had enquired about using the recently commissioned manned deep-ocean research submersible DSV Alvin to study the life habits of the giant squid (he included a photo of #169 with his letter), but the idea never progressed due to funding issues. The original proposal for Aluminaut, another manned submersible launched around the same time as Alvin, also mentioned the giant squid, but this project was never realised either. In a 1974 interview with The Los Angeles Times, Aldrich said: "I've got to get me a live giant [...] We will use lights, chopped-up shark as bait in a basket, a big jig. Divers will walk the beast into the boat." Jon Lien—once a member of Aldrich's "squid squad"—wrote: "I'm not sure how successful the jigger would have been in landing the squid; it worked quite well in recruiting assistant professors." Even earlier, science fiction writer Arthur C. Clarke had explored the idea of catching and filming a live giant squid in the short story "Big Game Hunt" and the novel The Deep Range, both published in 1957.)—had begun in earnest in the 1980s and intensified significantly in the following decade, with several multi-million-dollar expeditions launched in the late 1990s. While these were all unsuccessful, they were followed by a steady stream of live giant squid "firsts" in the nascent years of the 21st century, and spurred further efforts that ultimately culminated in the first footage of live giant squid in their natural deep-ocean habitat—recorded off Japan's Ogasawara Islands in 2012.

The turn of the century also roughly coincided with a shift in the way new giant squid specimens were reported and information on them was disseminated. The rapidly growing popularity of the World Wide Web resulted in a proliferation of both online news sources and platforms for sharing and discussing said news, the latter facilitating a never-before-seen level of engagement between professional teuthologists and amateur enthusiasts. (Note: An early example were the giant squid expeditions of 1997 and 1999, the progress of which could be tracked through online expedition journals that provided daily updates, many of them written by expedition leader and giant squid expert Clyde Roper. Also of note were the online contributions of marine biologist and giant squid expert Steve O'Shea, particularly in the first decade of the 21st century. During this time O'Shea was active on TONMO (The Octopus News Magazine Online), a website and forum for cephalopod enthusiasts, on which he often discussed and provided first-hand information on new giant squid finds. O'Shea put considerable effort into lowering the maximum size of the giant squid as reported in the media, especially the oft-quoted total length of 18 m (59 ft), which he countered with a more realistic 13 m (43 ft) based on the many specimens he had personally examined.) Consequently, much of the information on recent specimens is drawn from online rather than print sources, though scholarly papers continue to be published on individual specimens. There exists a sizeable internet community of giant squid enthusiasts, and developments in the field—particularly videos of live animals—generate considerable excitement online, a phenomenon that has been described as "giant squid mania".

Giant squid are generally considered inedible owing to the high concentration of ammonium chloride in their tissues, which renders them exceptionally bitter. (Note: Giant squid expert Clyde Roper once tried a piece sautéed in olive oil and garlic, describing it as "absolutely awful [...] very, very bitter".) However, processing methods to make them more palatable have been investigated, with drying and boiling showing some success. Beginning in the 2010s, a number of specimens have been prepared by hard curing, with some of these served for human consumption (e.g. #598, 603, and 617). Other forms of preparation have also been tried (e.g. #558, 602, 678, and 681), with occasional dubious claims of specimens being eaten raw (e.g. #83).

=== Quest for a live animal ===
"What will happen if someone finds it or takes its picture? It will lose some of its mystery, and, in a sense, we will be poorer for having been deprived of the anticipation of finding it. Often the realization of a long-held goal proves less fulfilling than the hungry waiting. [...] We need to find the giant squid, but we also need not to find it."

— Richard Ellis, from the concluding paragraph of his 1998 book The Search for the Giant Squid

Though the total number of recorded giant squid specimens now runs into the hundreds, the species remains notoriously elusive and little known, and has retained its status as a "quasi-mythical" animal. By the turn of the 21st century, the giant squid remained one of the few truly large extant megafauna to have never been photographed alive, either in the wild or in captivity. Marine writer and artist Richard Ellis described it as "the most elusive image in natural history". Acquiring footage of the animal in its natural habitat became "the holy grail of natural history cinematography".

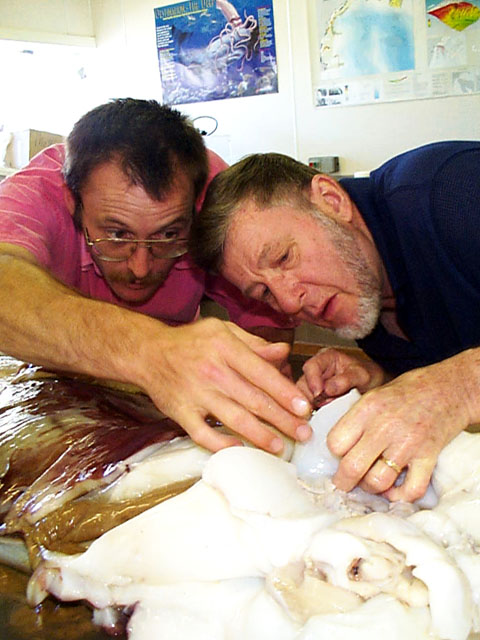
Steve O'Shea (left) and Clyde F. E. Roper examining a giant squid specimen during the 1999 "In Search of Giant Squid" expedition

==== Early expeditions ====
===== 1986–1990: Beebe Project =====
Though there had been proposals since at least the 1960s, the first dedicated effort to capture a glimpse of the animal in its natural habitat was probably the Beebe Project, initiated in 1986 and named after pioneering deep-sea explorer William Beebe. Like Beebe's original dives, it was initially conducted off Bermuda, which was not known for giant squid (but see #191). In addition to finding the giant squid, the expedition's other main objective was the study of six-gill sharks of the genus Hexanchus. The three-person submersible Pisces VI and the four-person Johnson Sea Link were used, the former reaching a maximum depth of 1.5 miles (2.4 km). Financed primarily by NOAA and organised and led by National Geographic photographer Emory Kristof, the expedition involved scientists from numerous universities and scientific institutions, including shark specialist Eugenie Clark and underwater explorer Joseph B. MacInnis; wildlife artist Glen Loates, known for his naturalistic depictions of the giant squid, was also involved.

The expedition relocated to Newfoundland in 1988, at which point it was joined by giant squid expert Frederick Aldrich of the Memorial University of Newfoundland. A series of seven dives to 300–1,000 ft (90–300 m) depth, lasting up to 10 hours each, were undertaken 8–50 miles (13–80 km) east-northeast of Bonavista Bay on 7–11 November 1988, this time using the Canadian Navy's SLD-1 submersible and the diving support vessel HMCS Cormorant. In 1989, Aldrich filmed a program about the giant squid for Fuji TV in Japan. Efforts continued until at least 1990; at one point, a "gigantic squid jig, painted bright red and outfitted with numerous hooks" was trialled, as was "hundreds of pounds" of raw tuna, but all attempts proved unsuccessful.

===== 1993: misidentified live specimen =====
A photograph purporting to show a live Architeuthis dux alongside a diver was published in the 1993 book European Seashells, but this turned out to be a sick or dying Onykia robusta (misidentification #[7]). Richard Ellis wrote: "Fortunately for those who have devoted their lives to searching for Architeuthis, this was only an aberration, a case of mistaken identity."

===== 1996–2001: Smithsonian expeditions and increasing global interest =====
After years of planning, a series of further expeditions aimed at capturing footage of a live giant squid in its natural habitat were mounted in the late 1990s, but all were unsuccessful. The three Smithsonian-backed efforts comprised a smaller-scale undertaking in the Azores (Note: Expedition leader Clyde Roper learned from Azorean former sperm whalers—who had practiced open-boat whaling into the latter half of the 20th century—that they would often see their quarry regurgitating giant squid after being harpooned.) in July 1996 and two major expeditions—known as "In Search of Giant Squid" (Note: A permanent exhibition of nearly identical name, "In Search of Giant Squids", opened at the Smithsonian's National Museum of Natural History on 27 May 1994. Curated by Clyde Roper, it included a "bioluminescent giant squid, able to flash blue-green light".)—to Kaikōura Canyon off New Zealand in January–March 1997 and February–March 1999 (the former covered by National Geographic and also sponsored by the New England Aquarium, and the latter including a BBC Television unit). These expeditions—the latter two each costing around US$10 million (equivalent to $19 million in 2025)—employed a combination of sperm whale–mounted crittercams, baited "ropecams" or "drop-cams", an Odyssey IIB unmanned underwater vehicle, and the single-person submersible Deep Rover. All three were led by giant squid expert Clyde Roper, with the first two also involving marine biologist Malcolm Clarke and the last two Steve O'Shea of NIWA; additionally, National Geographic photographer Emory Kristof took part in the first Kaikoura expedition and oceanographer Gene Carl Feldman in the second. (Note: Beast author Peter Benchley was originally meant to chronicle the first Kaikoura expedition but had to withdraw "at the last minute" due to back problems.) The Azores and first New Zealand expeditions were the subject of the 1998 National Geographic documentary Sea Monsters: Search for the Giant Squid; the second New Zealand expedition was the subject of the Discovery Channel's Quest for the Giant Squid, released in 2000.

Marine writer and artist Richard Ellis joined the first of the New Zealand expeditions and, in 1998, released a popular nonfiction book, The Search for the Giant Squid, further raising interest in the pursuit of a live animal. In 2000, Roper said: "I would guess at this point a half a dozen individuals or groups would like to find one." Oceanographic explorer Jean-Michel Cousteau, son of Jacques-Yves Cousteau, led another unsuccessful expedition to New Zealand that ended in early 2001.

==== 21st century breakthroughs ====
===== 2001–2002: first videos of live paralarvae and first photographs of live adults =====
The 2002 specimen from Goshiki beach (#464) is seen here tied with a rope, its delicate reddish skin only partially intact. Muscular constriction around the squid's giant eye obscures much of its surface in this image.

In February 2001, a team led by Steve O'Shea and also including Malcolm Clarke and Chung Cheng Lu succeeded in capturing the first footage of a live giant squid when they caught and filmed several paralarval individuals measuring 9–13 mm (0.35–0.51 in) in total length (#444). The expedition involved the NIWA research vessels RV Kaharoa and RV Tangaroa, and the New Zealand fishing trawler Tasman Viking. Seven live individuals were retrieved in 12 days from some 100 tows. However, attempts by aquaculturist Mike Tait to simulate their natural conditions in a tank proved unsuccessful and all the paralarvae soon died. The expedition was the subject of the Discovery Channel documentary Chasing Giants: On the Trail of the Giant Squid, first aired in 2002.

This milestone was followed by the first images of a live adult giant squid (at the surface) on 15 January 2002, near Goshiki beach in Amino-cho, Kyoto Prefecture, Japan (#464). (Note: Though see specimen #323 from Tottori Prefecture, Japan, which was reportedly still alive when found stranded in shallow water on 16 April 1988, where it was photographed in situ.) The animal, which measured about 2 m (6.6 ft) in mantle length and 4 m (13 ft) including the head and arms, was found near the water's surface. It was captured and tied to a quay, where it died overnight. These images were joined by a number of little-publicised photographs of live adults at the surface off Okinawa (#472, 473, and 488). (Note: A number of photographs of live adult giant squid at the surface off Okinawa came to light in 2003 (#472 and 473), but it is uncertain when these were taken. Another live animal was photographed at the surface in the same area on 15 April 2004 (#488).)

Renewed interest in filming a live giant squid followed the 2001 recording of an enormous specimen of bigfin squid (likely of the family Magnapinnidae) at great depth off Hawaii, which received global media attention, and the observation of a possible giant squid egg mass in early 2002 (later determined to be that of Nototodarus gouldi—misidentification #[9]). This was followed by further efforts by O'Shea to capture live paralarval specimens.

===== 2002–2003: Proyecto Kraken and other unsuccessful attempts =====
Another unsuccessful attempt to film a live adult in the wild, dubbed Proyecto Kraken ("Project Kraken"), was made off the Spanish coast of Asturias in September 2002 (with a preliminary expedition in October 2001). This attempt was led by giant squid expert Ángel Guerra and involved the expedition ships Científico and Investigador and the Spanish Navy patrol ship Mouro (P-24). It initially employed a trio of autonomous underwater camera rigs connected to buoys at the surface, with adjustable visible and infrared lights and a combination of acoustic and optical lures. During the latter part of the expedition, a remotely operated underwater vehicle was used within an area of 8 hectares (20 acres) across which 100 lots of weighted bait, totalling 1.5 tonnes (1.5 long tons; 1.7 short tons) of frozen mackerel and sardines, had been released. Though unsuccessful in filming a live giant squid, Proyecto Kraken yielded a single well-preserved male specimen by trawl (#469). The expedition was the subject of the 2003 documentary film Proyecto Kraken: En Busca del Calamar Gigante, released in English as Kraken Project: In Search of the Giant Squid. A follow-up expedition off Asturias was planned for September 2006. Later efforts were suspended due to the Spanish financial crisis.

Amid growing competition between researchers, in 2003 it was reported that O'Shea was leading a team that planned to image a live giant squid by suspending cameras in the water column that would release "puréed" female gonads to attract a male or else to release extracts from the gonads of both sexes from a remotely operated underwater vehicle at around 600 m depth. The first trial of this latter approach was planned for July 2004. A number of unsuccessful attempts were also made by a different team to film a live giant squid off South Korea.

Around the same time, Bruce Robison of the Monterey Bay Aquarium Research Institute (MBARI) led a twenty-one person team on the flagship research vessel RV Western Flyer (deploying ROV Tiburon) in search of the giant squid in Monterey Canyon, although this was not the only goal of the expedition. In 1980, Robison had come close to catching a live adult specimen when, also in Californian waters, he pulled up a freshly severed tentacle (#246), complete with "grasping" suckers.

The 50th frame of the more than 550 taken on 30 September 2004 by Kubodera and Mori's remote camera system, and the first to capture the giant squid (#492). The downward-facing camera shows the squid attacking horizontally, its head and arms in frame. Between the arms, the bait appears to be enveloped in an irregular ball formed by the two long tentacles, a mode of attack the authors compared to that of pythons.

===== 2004: first photographs of live animal in natural habitat =====
It was only on 30 September 2004 that a live giant squid was photographed in its natural deep-water habitat, off the Ogasawara Islands, by Tsunemi Kubodera and Kyoichi Mori (#492), the culmination of an effort that spanned three years and 26 week-long expeditions. The researchers employed a remote camera system suspended from floats at the surface on a long-line of up to 1,000 m (3,300 ft). The system consisted of a downward-facing camera with a light and data logger, below which extended a weighted 3 m (9.8 ft) fishing line containing three items of bait at intervals along its length: a large hook with a Japanese flying squid (Todarodes pacificus) of 22–25 cm (8.7–9.8 in) mantle length, a mesh bag containing euphausids (krill) to act as an odour lure, and finally a second bait squid directly attached to a weighted squid jig. The camera was configured to take one image every 30 seconds.

The giant squid attacked the deployed bait at a depth of 900 m (3,000 ft), becoming snagged on the associated jig. Over the next 4 hours and 13 minutes it periodically came into camera view as it struggled to free itself, gradually pulling the camera system up to a depth of around 600 m (2,000 ft) before apparently tiring and slowly sinking to almost 1,000 m (3,300 ft), at which point it severed its own tentacle and escaped. The tentacle was recovered and used to confirm the squid's taxonomic identity via DNA sequencing. It measured 5.5 m (18 ft) in length, with a tentacular club of 72 cm (2.36 ft), and was used to estimate the mantle length at around 1.6–1.7 m (5.2–5.6 ft), the standard length (excluding tentacles) at 4.7 m (15 ft), and the total length at more than 8 m (26 ft). The images provided a unique insight into the feeding habits of the giant squid and suggested that it was a far more active predator than had previously been thought; the findings were published in the 22 December 2005 issue of Proceedings of the Royal Society B: Biological Sciences. They were the subject of the 2006 Discovery Channel documentary Giant Squid: Caught on Camera.

===== 2006–2012: first video of live adult and subsequent efforts =====
Kubodera and his team, again working off the Ogasawara Islands, subsequently became the first to film a live adult giant squid on 4 December 2006 (#508). (Note: Though Kubodera et al. on 4 December 2006 (#508) and Kubodera, O'Shea, Widder et al. in July 2012 (#548 and 549) are widely recognised as the first to, respectively, film a live adult giant squid (at the surface) and the first to film a live (adult) giant squid in its natural habitat, there exists at least one competing claim to both of these milestones. In November 2006, American explorer and diver Scott Cassell led an expedition to the Gulf of California (Sea of Cortez) with the aim of filming a giant squid in its natural habitat. The team employed a novel filming method: using a Humboldt squid (Dosidicus gigas) carrying a specially designed camera clipped to its fin. The camera-bearing squid caught on film what was claimed to be a very large giant squid engaging in predatory behaviour; its total length was variously estimated at 108 ft (33 m), 30–120 ft (9.1–36.6 m), and 40 ft (12 m). The footage was broadcast a year later on the History Channel, on the MonsterQuest episode "Giant Squid Found", and in the follow-up episode "Giant Squid Ambush" in 2008. Cassell subsequently distanced himself from this documentary, claiming that it contained multiple factual and scientific errors.) The animal was caught on a baited hook at 650 m (2,130 ft) depth and pulled to the surface, where it was recorded waving its arms and ejecting large volumes of water from its funnel. It was then brought aboard the research vessel, dying in the process. The squid measured approximately 1.4 m (4.6 ft) in mantle length and 3.5 m (11 ft) to the tips of the arms (both tentacles were missing), and weighed nearly 50 kg (110 lb). Notably, footage of the squid at the surface showed the animal exhibiting conspicuous countershading, being reddish dorsally and silvery-white ventrally. The observed forceful ejection of water from the funnel provided further evidence for an active lifestyle and significant swimming ability in this species.

However, the quest to film a live giant squid in its natural habitat continued. An unsuccessful National Geographic–backed attempt off the Azores was made in 2011, headed by camera expert Martin Dohrn and assisted by Malcolm Clarke. Working from the vessel Makaira, the team used a combination of their monochrome Starlight cameras and a purpose-built Colour Starlight camera (with a film speed equivalent to 2 million ASA), which were deployed at a depth of 500 m on a custom-made stealth rig called "the Gupster" and linked to the surface by fibre-optic cable. The project was the subject of the documentary film Hunt for the Giant Squid, released the same year. Around this time, Steve O'Shea joined an expedition to the Gulf of California (Sea of Cortez) organised by a team of shark experts and anglers led by Chris Fischer that likewise aimed to film a giant squid in the wild, despite the species having never been recorded there. The team (minus O'Shea) had previously found a mutilated giant squid carcass (#540) off the Pacific coast of North America. Working from the mother ship MV Ocean, the team trialled a number of approaches, including clipping a camera onto the fin of a Humboldt squid (Dosidicus gigas; similar to the method used by the MonsterQuest team in 2006, also in the Gulf of California), attaching a piece of preserved giant squid to an ROUV arm, doing the same with a bag containing a blended giant squid ovary, using an ROUV baited with a restrained live Humboldt squid, and using a deep-water ROUV with imaging sonar. Gastric lavage (stomach pumping) of line-caught mako sharks provided no evidence of their predation on giant squid (though it confirmed that they prey on Humboldt squid), and by the end of the expedition no evidence of the giant squid's presence in the Gulf of California had been found. Though these efforts were unsuccessful, they were the subject of "The Cannibal" (or "Cannibals of Cortez") and "Giants of the Deep" (or "Squid Row"), two episodes of the National Geographic Channel series Expedition Great White (retroactively retitled Shark Men), first aired in 2011. In 2012, a team including Natacha Aguilar de Soto of the University of La Laguna lowered a camera to a depth of 200–800 m (660–2,600 ft) off El Hierro, Canary Islands, in the hopes of filming a giant squid, but to no avail. Around the same time, researchers at the University of Aberdeen's Oceanlab also expressed an interest in filming the giant squid in its natural habitat.

===== 2012: first videos of live animals in natural habitat =====
"The color was utterly different than any of us expected. The one that had been brought to the surface and that there's pictures of on the web [#508] was red, and a lot of deep-sea squid are red. But this was a spectacular silver and gold. It looks like it's carved out of metal; it's just absolutely breathtaking and completely unexpected."

— Edith Widder, speaking about the live animal filmed in July 2012 (#549) on NPR's All Things Considered, 13 January 2013

The elusive footage was finally captured in July 2012 by a team comprising Kubodera, O'Shea and Edith Widder, after more than 285 hours underwater and 55 submersible dives. The project was a joint effort by NHK, Discovery Channel, and Japan's National Museum of Nature and Science. Early plans announced in 2010 called for the use of modified crittercams that would be attached to sperm whales using suction cups, as in the Smithsonian expeditions of the 1990s, but these were later dropped. The attempt had originally been planned for 2011 but was postponed due to the 2011 Tōhoku earthquake and tsunami. Like Kubodera's two previous "firsts", the milestone was achieved off the Ogasawara archipelago. Initially, black-and-white video of a live giant squid (#548) was recorded on 1 July 2012 (Note: Ph.D. student Wen-Sung Chung, who was reviewing the "Medusa" footage while Widder was on a submersible dive, was the first to view the recording and therefore the first person to see video of a live giant squid in its natural habitat. The footage was first seen by Chung and the rest of the team on 3 July, having been recorded two days earlier.) at a depth of around 700 m (2,300 ft) from a "Medusa" remote camera system, which was suspended from a buoy at the surface. This system employed Widder's "e-jelly", a flashing ball meant to mimic the bioluminescent signalling of a panicking Atolla jellyfish, a behaviour hypothesised to be a last-ditch effort on the part of the jellyfish to attract a predator of its predator and thereby enable its escape.

In total, five sightings of giant squid were made using this system, the last being the most impressive: the squid was recorded passing over the "e-jelly" and apparently attacking the camera system directly, lending credence to the "alarm hypothesis". About a week after the first sighting using the "Medusa" system, a live animal (#549) was filmed by a three-man crew (including Kubodera) from a Triton 3300/3 submersible (launched from OceanX's research vessel MV Alucia), providing the first ever colour and high-quality film of a live giant squid in its natural habitat. The squid, which was about 3 m (9.8 ft) long and missing its feeding tentacles, was initially observed at a depth of 630 m (2,070 ft) and later followed to around 900 m (3,000 ft). It was drawn into viewing range through a combination of a flashing squid jig and the use of a large Thysanoteuthis rhombus (diamondback squid) as bait. The giant squid was filmed feeding for about 23 minutes until it departed. The footage was the subject of two full-length documentaries that premiered in January 2013: NHK's Legends of the Deep: Giant Squid and Discovery Channel's Monster Squid: The Giant is Real. In July of the same year it appeared in a special episode of the BBC series Natural World, titled "Giant Squid: Filming The Impossible", which was adapted from the NHK documentary. O'Shea later opined that the extended submersible encounter was "[u]ndoubtedly the most-significant moment [...] Everything else pales in significance to this moment."

===== 2013–present: live animals documented at the surface =====
A diver swimming with a live giant squid (#637) in a harbour on the coast of Toyama Bay on 24 December 2015. The animal, who gained the nickname 'Heck', spent several hours in the harbour, where it was filmed by local divers before being guided out to sea. The resulting videos rank among the highest-quality live giant squid footage ever captured. Note the animal's splayed arms, which it repeatedly wrapped around the divers when approached.

Since the 2012 milestone, live giant squid have been photographed and filmed at the surface on a number of occasions, mostly in Japanese waters (#564, 569, 606, 613, 614, 615, 618, 626, 630, 635, 637, 639, 644, 659, 669, 673, and 677)—the majority of these as part of the mass appearance event in the Sea of Japan between January 2014 and March 2015—but also off Spain (#648) and South Africa (#650). Additionally, two freshly stranded animals were photographed alive on South African beaches (#557 and 674), and at least four individuals were briefly kept alive in tanks in Japan (#573, 580, 587, and 632). (Note: All of the specimens kept alive in tanks were rather small individuals and survived for only a few hours at most. The idea of keeping a fully grown giant squid in captivity—long term—has been mooted on occasion but is considered exceedingly challenging and has never been attempted.)

Notable among these encounters was a specimen (#637) seen in Toyama Bay, Japan, on 24 December 2015, the video of which is one of the highest-quality ever recorded. The squid was apparently swimming normally when a local diving shop owner dove alongside it, and after a few hours of being filmed in a harbour the animal was guided back into the open ocean. It was estimated to be 3.7 m (12 ft) long excluding the tentacles, and is believed to be a juvenile. Two other specimens from Toyama Bay (#613 and 618) were similarly filmed by divers and were actually encountered slightly earlier, contrary to some claims about the former specimen being the first encounter of its type. (Note: The Diving Almanac & Book of Records of 2016, for example, recognises specimen #637 as the first to be filmed by a diver, though with the incorrect date of 24 January 2015 instead of 24 December 2015. The same source also considers this specimen (with the correct date) to be the "[l]argest squid observed on a dive" (but see #618).) Another noteworthy encounter was that between a paddleboarder and a badly injured individual (#650) off Melkbosstrand, South Africa, in March 2017, with the stricken animal filmed wrapping its arms around the paddleboard.

"In terms of Architeuthis sightings, historically, all we've had are dead animals. Now, we're seeing live animals being photographed and filmed. The progress that's been made in securing footage of these animals, and in understanding their life history and biology, over the last few years is phenomenal, compared to where we were several years ago."

— Steve O'Shea, quoted by Mark Dery in 2013

===== 2013–present: further efforts to film live animals in natural habitat =====
In August 2013, Kirsten and Joachim Jakobsen announced an Evonik Industries–backed project to film a fully intact adult giant squid in its natural habitat off the Azores and thereby determine how the species uses its long tentacles (missing in the 2012 specimen) for feeding. Efforts were ongoing as of 2015. In September 2018, it was reported that Tsunemi Kubodera was to "hunt" giant squid in Toyama Prefecture, Japan, in January–February 2019 for a documentary about his work on the species by filmmaker Shinichi Motoki.

Another video of a live giant squid in its natural deep-water habitat (#664)—reported at the time as the second ever recorded—was captured in the Gulf of Mexico at 759 m (2,490 ft) depth in June 2019 by a NOAA-funded team that included Widder and marine biologists Nathan J. Robinson and Sönke Johnsen. The animal was seen striking an "e-jelly" lure and attached bait bag before retreating. It seemed to track the up-and-down motion of the camera rig prior to striking, indicating that giant squid are primarily visual predators that actively stalk their prey. It subsequently came to light that a seven-second clip of a live giant squid (#654)—little publicised initially—had been captured in October 2017, off the southern coast of El Hierro in the Canary Islands at around 500 m (1,600 ft) depth, making the Gulf of Mexico video the third such recording. In 2018, environmental DNA (eDNA) sampling was used to monitor the spatiotemporal distribution of giant squid for the first time. The technique revealed the presence of giant squid in the Sea of Japan in winter but not in summer, in close agreement with historical stranding patterns.

A giant squid (#672) was again filmed in its natural habitat on 19 March 2020, this time in Bremer Bay off southwestern Australia. It was recorded from a remote camera system at a depth of around 800 m by a team once again led by Tsunemi Kubodera. The resulting footage was the first to show a giant squid using its tentacles for feeding. A short documentary released in 2021 followed another effort to film an underwater encounter between a sperm whale and a giant squid, but off the Caribbean archipelago of Guadeloupe. As in the Smithsonian expeditions of the late 1990s, it involved attaching cameras to the whales using suction cups. In one of the resulting videos, an undetermined squid limb briefly came into view, but no definitive footage of a giant squid was captured.

== List of giant squid ==
Misidentification (non-architeuthid) Record encompassing multiple specimens Photographed or filmed while alive

#	Date	Location	Nature of encounter	Identification	Material cited	Material saved	Sex	Size and measurements	Repository	Main references	Additional references	Notes
	1 January 2001	south Gran Canaria, Canary Islands {NEA}	Found floating at surface	Architeuthis dux	Entire?, "partially damaged"; possibly with incomplete limbs and missing posterior end of mantle	Beak (at least)	Female	DML: 1060 mm [DML estimated from LRL: 1014/1272 mm]; EL: 6.5 m [estimated from DML estimate]; LRL: 14.4 mm [tip broken]; URL: 14.3 mm; additional beak measurements	[specimen ID2 of Perales-Raya et al. (2020)]	Perales-Raya et al. (2020:359, 361, 365)		Spermatangia subcutaneously implanted around eyes. Beak increments used by Perales-Raya et al. (2020) to estimate age at 480 days. Beak preserved in 70% ethanol upon collection; rehydrated in distilled water for several days prior to age estimation.
441 (📷)	12 January 2001	approximately 34 miles (55 km) from Gijón, off coast of Asturias, Spain (43°52.54′N 05°18.74′W) at 300–600 m depth {NEA}	By trawl, alive	Architeuthis dux Steenstrup, 1857	Entire; missing arms III; arm II (L) not intact	Entire	Female (immature)	ML: 1350 mm; MW: 400 mm; EL: 8010 mm; WT: 81 kg; VML: 1190 mm; MT: 22 mm; HW: 260 mm; AL(I): 2310/2400 mm; AL(II): 1791/1900 mm [first not intact]; AL(IV): 1870/1920 mm; TL: 6370/6530 mm; TCL: 770/790 mm; DC: 120/160 mm; MaL: 510/490 mm; CaL: 140/140 mm; LRL: 15.9 mm; URL: 16.5 mm; GL: 1180 mm; GW: 150 mm; FL: 560 mm; FW: 400 mm; EyD: 120 mm [estimate]; FuL: 160 mm; FuCL: 135 mm; FuCW: 25 mm; GiL: 370 mm; NGL: 150 mm	CEPESMA	González et al. (2002:859, fig. 1A); Guerra et al. (2004b:2, fig. 1); Guerra et al. (2006:64, 259, fig. 16)		Second record of living specimen collected in Spanish Atlantic waters. Caught by pair trawler Minchos V targeting blue whiting (Micromesistius poutassou). Frozen immediately after measurements taken; later defrosted, dissected, and reconstructed. Placed in transparent glass case and fixed for 48 hours in 4% formalin; later preserved in 70% alcohol.
442 (📷)	26 January 2001	off Sandy Cape, northwest Tasmania, Australia (41.38°S 144.23°E) at 800 m depth {SWP}	By trawl	Architeuthis dux	Entire	Entire		None given	NMV catalog no. MV F88555	[TMAG] (2007:20); [MV] (2013a)		On public display. Preserved in 70% ethanol and 4% formalin buffered with borax. Exhibited at Melbourne Museum's Science & Life Gallery.
443 (📷)	7 February 2001 (reported; caught prior week)	off south-west Australia {SWP}	"Caught by commercial fishermen"	"giant squid"	Entire, "near-perfect specimen"; missing tentacles	Entire		WL: 12 ft (3.7 m); EL: 36 ft (11 m) [estimate]; WT: 200/250 kg	Melbourne Museum	[Anon.] (2001a); [Anon.] (2001b); [Anon.] (2001c)		Melbourne Museum took possession of specimen on 7 February 2001; placed in preservative fluid. Fish and smaller squids found in digestive tract. Visiting scientist Mark Norman interviewed about find.
444 (📷)	February 2001	250 km east of South Island, New Zealand {SWP}	Paralarvae caught alive and filmed "swimming robustly" in tank	Architeuthis	Seven live individuals (14 in total)			?EL: 9–13 mm		Baird (2002); P. Young (2002)	Askwith (2002); E. Young (2003); Ellis (2005:146); Lamb (2018:51)	First video of live giant squid, albeit paralarval. Specimens caught by team led by Steve O'Shea and also including Malcolm Clarke and Chung Cheng Lu, after ~100 tows in 12 days. Attempts by aquaculturist Mike Tait to simulate natural conditions in tank proved unsuccessful as paralarvae soon died. Identified initially by comparison with morphology of preserved paralarvae from New Zealand (totalling some 16 records) and later by DNA sequencing. Featured in 2002 Discovery Channel documentary Chasing Giants: On the Trail of the Giant Squid.
445	May 2001	Caladero Lastres, Asturias, Spain {NEA}		Architeuthis				?EL: 9 m; WT: 90 kg		Guerra et al. (2006:259)		
446	10 June 2001	22 miles (35 km) east of Pacific Light, Florida Keys, Florida, United States (Straits of Florida) (24°40′N 80°30′W) {NWA}	Found floating at surface	Architeuthis dux	Not stated			None given	RSMAS; "ex UMML 31.3149" [specimen No. 20 of Roper et al. (2015)]	Roper et al. (2015:81)		Found over bottom depth of 725 m.
447 (📷)	25 June 2001	off Málaga, Andalusia, Spain, at ~400 m depth {MED}	By trawl, alive; died shortly thereafter	Architeuthis	Entire; tentacles intact	Entire	Female (immature)	ML: 125 cm; EL: 750 cm; WT: 65 kg	Museo Nacional de Ciencias Naturales, Madrid, Spain	[Anon.] (2001f); Guerra et al. (2006:89)	Rivas (2003)	On public display. Nicknamed "Archi". Second known giant squid specimen from the Mediterranean Sea. Caught by trawler Neptuno. Examined at Instituto Oceanográfico de Málaga, based in Fuengirola. Delivered to Museo Nacional de Ciencias Naturales in Madrid in freezer truck (−18 °C) on 1 October 2001 and there preserved under supervision of cephalopod expert Oscar Soriano; exhibited in tank. According to Guerra et al. (2006:89), found washed ashore dead but relatively fresh on Fuengirola beach on 27 June 2001 (confusion with #383?).
448	2 July 2001	west of Carrandi, Asturias, Spain {NEA}	Caught	Architeuthis				?EL: 7.10 m; WT: 60 kg		Guerra et al. (2006:259)		Caught by the Spanish vessels Elena María and Bautista Pino from Cillero.
449	6 July 2001	30 miles (48 km) off Bermuda (32°00′N 64°40′W; given as "32°N 64°40'W") {NWA}	Found floating at surface	Architeuthis dux	Not stated		Male	"total length": ~5 ft (1.5 m)	[specimen No. 21 of Roper et al. (2015)]	Roper et al. (2015:81)		
	15 July 2001	~300 miles (480 km) west of Azores {NEA}	By trawl, dead	Architeuthis dux	Entire, "relatively good" condition; arms, tentacles and distal end of mantle damaged	Entire		ML: 1.5 m; EL: ~5 m [estimate]; EyD: "size of apple"; WT: ~145 lb (66 kg)		[Anon.] (2001e); Corrales (2001)	Askwith (2002)	Caught by Spanish vessel Nueva Zumaia while trawling for swordfish after apparently being attracted to fish bait. Frozen at sea; landed in Vigo in early August and transferred to Spanish Oceanographic Institute (IEO) on 6 August. Biologist Mario Rasero of IEO interviewed about find. Planned to be preserved in methacrylate container with 50% alcohol after formaldehyde injected into tissues, and exhibited in museum.
450	4 September 2001	off west coast of Tasmania, Australia, at 400–460 m depth {SWP}	By trawl, alive	Architeuthis sp.	Entire?	Entire		None given	TMAG catalog no. E23426	[TMAG] (2007:19)		Caught by trawler primarily targeting blue grenadier and secondarily dory. Squid was "just alive" when pulled up. Muscle tissue and part of arm/tentacle kept at Tasmanian Museum and Art Gallery (TMAG), rest given to Melbourne Aquarium where frozen; due to be returned to TMAG but transfer not completed as of 7 October 2002.
451	12 September 2001	Playa de Rodiles (Villaviciosa), Asturias, Spain [or off Luarca] {NEA}	Found washed ashore [or by trawl]	Architeuthis dux	Entire?, missing tentacles	Entire?	Female (immature)	ML: 127 cm; EL: 710 cm; WT: 60/90 kg		Guerra et al. (2006:259); Bustamante et al. (2008)		Tissues studied for concentrations of 14 trace elements. Digestive gland, gills, ink sac, branchial hearts, appendages, systemic heart, and brain removed during study.
452 (📷)	20 September 2001	Playa de Torimbia (Llanes), Asturias, Spain {NEA}	Found washed ashore [or caught]	Architeuthis				?EL: 7.2/10 m; WT: 104 kg	Musée de la Mer, Biarritz	Vrignon (2001); Guerra et al. (2006:259)		On public display. Autopsied on Saint-Jean-de-Luz quayside on 23 October 2001; auctioned there shortly afterwards. Stomach notably full. Estimated to be two years old. Oceanographic Museum of Monaco was in running to acquire specimen but owner CEPESMA gave preference to Musée de la Mer in Biarritz, who were to open gallery dedicated to deep-sea animals on 26 October; there subsequently exhibited. Preserved in mix of formaldehyde and alcohol.
453	23 September 2001	Caladero de El Corbiro, Asturias, Spain {NEA}	By trawl	Architeuthis			Female (immature)	WT: 73.5 kg		Guerra et al. (2006:259)		
454	8 October 2001	Kerguelen waters in southern Polar Frontal Zone (47°19′S 69°11′E) at 600 m depth {SIO}	Found in stomach contents of sleeper shark (Somniosus sp.)	Architeuthis dux	Lower and upper beak	Entire		LRL: 18.13 mm; ML: 220 cm [estimate]		Cherel (2003:1296); Cherel & Duhamel (2004:25)	Rincon (2004)	Mantle length estimated using allometric equation from Roeleveld (2000).
455	8 October 2001	Kerguelen waters in southern Polar Frontal Zone (47°19′S 69°11′E) at 600 m depth {SIO}	Found in stomach contents of sleeper shark (Somniosus sp.)	Architeuthis dux	Lower and upper beak; broken	Entire				Cherel (2003:1296); Cherel & Duhamel (2004:25)	Rincon (2004)	
456	23 October 2001	Playa de S. Cosme de Barreiros (Lugo), Asturias, Spain [or Ribadesella] {NEA}	Found washed ashore	Architeuthis dux	Entire?	Entire?	Female (maturing)	ML: 150 cm; EL: 800 cm/9.5 m; WT: 90/104 kg		Guerra et al. (2006:259); Bustamante et al. (2008)		Tissues studied for concentrations of 14 trace elements. Digestive gland, gills, ink sac, branchial hearts, appendages, systemic heart, and brain removed during study.
457	21 November 2001	Kerguelen waters in southern Polar Frontal Zone (48°06′S 71°18′E) at 453–575 m depth {SIO}	Found in stomach contents of sleeper shark (Somniosus sp.)	Architeuthis dux	Lower beak only	Entire		LRL: 10.43 mm; ML: 45 cm [estimate]		Cherel (2003:1296); Cherel & Duhamel (2004:25)	Rincon (2004)	Mantle length estimated using allometric equation from Roeleveld (2000).
458	Unknown (reported 2002)	North Atlantic (otherwise "no data") {NEA/NWA}		Architeuthis			Female (maturing)	ML: 1480 mm; TL: 5910 mm [right]; CL: 830 mm [right]; CSC: 255 [right]; TSC: 279 [right]; additional indices and counts	VSM [specimen NA-21 of Roeleveld (2002)]	Roeleveld (2002:727)		Tentacle morphology examined by Roeleveld (2002).
459	Unknown (reported 2002)	North Atlantic (otherwise "no data") {NEA/NWA}		Architeuthis		Right club		TL: 1490+ mm; CL: 880 mm; CSC: 277; TSC: >288; additional indices and counts	VSM [specimen NA-26 of Roeleveld (2002)]	Roeleveld (2002:727)		Tentacle morphology examined by Roeleveld (2002).
460	Unknown (reported 2002)	North Atlantic (otherwise "no locality data") {NEA/NWA}		Architeuthis		Left club at least	Male (mature)	ML: 1180 mm	VSM [specimen NA-20 of Roeleveld (2002)]	Roeleveld (2002:726, fig. 1)		Only referred to in single caption; not included in main study of Roeleveld (2002).
461	2002	off Santa Catarina, Brazil {SWA}	"found"	Architeuthis				None given		Martins & Perez (2009)		Unreported prior to Martins & Perez (2009).
462	2002	off Nishiizu, Shizuoka Prefecture, Japan {NWP}	Photographed by diver	Architeuthis	Entire?	None?	(larva)	?EL: ~2 cm		Yoshikawa (2014)		First time "baby" giant squid photographed by diver, according to Yoshikawa (2014).
463 (📷)	3 January 2002	west of St Kilda, Scotland, at 770 m depth {NEA}	By trawl	Architeuthis	Entire, missing tentacles	Entire	Female	WL: 3.15 m; EL: 5.5 m [estimate]	National Marine Aquarium (Plymouth)	[Anon.] (2002a); [Anon.] (2002c)	Askwith (2002); [Anon.] (2003a)	On public display. Caught by Fraserburgh trawler Marina Polaris. Specimen preserved in formaldehyde and displayed in custom-made tank at the National Marine Aquarium in Plymouth.
464 (📷)	15 January 2002	Goshiki beach, Amino-cho, Kyoto Prefecture, Japan {NWP}	Found near surface; tied to quay with rope where photographed alive; died overnight	Architeuthis	Entire; reddish skin partly missing	Entire		?ML: 2 m; ?WL: 4 m	National Museum of Nature and Science (Tokyo)	[Anon.] (2002b); O'Shea (2003f); [Anon.] (2006g); [Anon.] (2008a); [Anon.] (2008b)	Martin (2006); Hellwarth (2012); Gallant (2016:47)	On public display. First images of live adult giant squid (but see #472 and 473). Identified by Koutarou Tsuchiya of the Tokyo University of Fisheries. Photographed alive while tied to quay; seen inking. Exhibited at the National Museum of Nature and Science in Tokyo.
[9] (📷)	mid-February 2002	off Poor Knights Islands, Northland Region, North Island, New Zealand {SWP}	Large egg mass photographed in shallow water	ball-like salp; egg mass of pelagic squid (possibly giant squid owing to size); egg mass of Nototodarus gouldi	Egg mass	None		diameter: 2 m	None	Doak (2002a); Doak (2002b); [Anon.] (2002d)	Bolstad (2009)	Non-architeuthid. Photographed by photojournalists Jenny and Tony Enderby and posted on website of marine researcher Wade Doak. First known photo of such a squid egg mass (at least from New Zealand). Identified as egg mass of pelagic squid by Steve O'Shea (species later determined to be Nototodarus gouldi). Resulting discussions brought to light several similar sightings (including a photograph from the same area), one later identified by DNA analysis as the egg mass of an arrow squid (Nototodarus sp.).
465	11 March 2002	Playa del Gayo (Luanco, Gozón), Asturias, Spain {NEA}	Found washed ashore	Architeuthis			Female (immature)	WT: 70 kg		Guerra et al. (2006:259)		
(📷)	21 March 2002 (reported) Aktuell?-->	south of Los Cristianos, Tenerife, Canary Islands {NEA}	Found floating at surface, dead	Architeuthis dux	Entire; missing tentacles, arm tips, posterior half of mantle, and most of reddish skin	Beak and other "important parts"		BL: 1 m; EL: 5 m [estimate]; ASD: 1.5 cm; EyD: ~13 cm		[Aldebaran] (2002); Kunz (2002); Miske (2002); see discussion		Found surrounded by gulls by crew of media and research sailing yacht Aldebaran during pilot whale research project in cooperation with SECAC, led by whale researcher Antonella Servidio. Appeared recently killed, probably by sperm whale, with bite marks on mantle. Dissected by biologist Uli Kunz in Tenerife port of Las Galletas; gladius extracted. Commented on by cephalopod expert Volker Christian Miske of University of Greifswald's Zoological Institute and Museum; beak and unspecified other parts preserved for scientific analysis in Greifswald.
	5 June 2002	south Tenerife, Canary Islands {NEA}	Found floating at surface	Architeuthis dux	Entire?, "partially damaged"; possibly with incomplete limbs and missing posterior end of mantle	Beak (at least)	Female	?WL: 1620 mm; DML: 823/1151 mm [estimated from LRL]; EL: 5.9 m [estimated from DML estimate]; LRL: 13.4 mm; URL: 13.3 mm; additional beak measurements	[specimen ID3 of Perales-Raya et al. (2020)]	Perales-Raya et al. (2020:359, 361, 365)		Beak increments used by Perales-Raya et al. (2020) to estimate age at 415 days. Beak preserved in 70% ethanol upon collection; rehydrated in distilled water for several days prior to age estimation.
466 (📷)	20 July 2002	Seven Mile Beach, Hobart, Tasmania, Australia {SWP}	Found washed ashore	Architeuthis sp.; initially speculated to be a new species	Entire, in at least 3 pieces (mantle, head and arms, single arm); missing tentacles	Entire; later discarded	Female (adult)	EL: 50 ft (15 m) [estimate]; WT: 190/~250 kg	TMAG catalog no. E24301	[Anon.] (2002e, 2 figs.); Trivedi (2002); [TMAG] (2007:19)	Askwith (2002); [Anon.] (2003a, fig.); [Anon.] (2007c)	Likely broken up by surf. Reported as possible new species: "Experts found several characteristics which they say they have never encountered before – including long, thin flaps of muscle attached to each of the squid's eight arms." Spermatophores found around base of arms. Study supervised by David Pemberton, senior curator of zoology at Tasmanian Museum and Art Gallery. Sucker marks and scar on head point to likely encounter with male. Damaged by repeated freezing and thawing for public display; main specimen eventually discarded but some remains may have been retained.
467	August 2002 (week prior to 19 August)	Hokitika Canyon, off West Coast, South Island, New Zealand {SWP}	"caught"	Architeuthis dux	5 specimens	Entire?		None given		O'Shea (2002)		According to Steve O'Shea, specimens indicated that giant squid were migrating into New Zealand waters to spawn "a month later than usual".
468	24 August 2002	near beach between Praia da Galé and Melides lagoon, west coast of Portugal (approximately 38°11′N 08°46′W) {NEA}	Found floating at surface	Architeuthis sp.	Entire; "fresh" condition		Male (mature)	ML: 111 cm; EL: 619.5 cm; ?WL: 188.5 cm ["total length without tentacles"]; WT: 60 kg (fresh weight)		Marques (2002); [Anon.] (2002f); Rosa et al. (2005:740)		First recorded specimen from Portuguese coast. Found during upwelling when surface water temperatures in region were 10–17 °C. Collected by technicians of Sado Estuary Natural Reserve and taken to Museu Oceanográfico do Portinho da Arrábida where it was deep-frozen. Studied for biochemical composition by Rosa et al. (2005).
469 (📷)	13 September 2002	in the proximity of "Pozo de la Vaca", off coast of Asturias, Spain (43°54.26′N 5°29.38′W) at 350 or c. 450–475 m depth {NEA}	By trawl	Architeuthis dux Steenstrup, 1857	Entire	Entire	Male (mature)	ML: 98/100 cm; MW: 33 cm; WT: 42/43 kg; EL: 600 cm; VML: 92 cm; BC: 76 cm; HL: 27 cm; HW: 28 cm; AL(IV): 176 cm; LAL: 176 cm; AC(I): 15.4 cm; AC(II): 19.7 cm; AC(III): 21.6 cm; AC(IV): 20+ cm; AF: 4.3.2.1; TL: 420/470 cm; TCL: 51 cm; DC: 15 cm; MaL: 29 cm; CaL: 7.9 cm; FL: 30 cm; FW: 28 cm; TaL: 8 cm; HeL: 4.5 cm [IV pair]; EyD: 8/10 cm; FuL: 17 cm; FuD: 5.5 cm; FuCL: 12 cm; FuCW: 3 cm; PL: 88 cm; SSL: 30 cm; SoA: yes; SL: 11.0–20.0 cm; LRL: 1.2 cm; URL: 1.0 cm	CEPESMA	[Anon.] (2002g); Sitges (2003); Guerra et al. (2004a:427, figs. 1–2); Guerra et al. (2004b:6, fig. 3); Guerra et al. (2006:242, 253, 259, figs. 80, 85)		Captured during Proyecto Kraken expedition by Spanish pair trawlers Elena María and Bautista Pino ~300 m from outer limit of first camera-bearing buoy; transferred to lead expedition ship Investigador soon afterwards where examined and dissected on deck. Claimed to be first male caught south of 55th parallel north in Atlantic, or even only male specimen caught in the world. Spermatophores embedded in skin. Autopsied at Museo Nacional de Ciencias Naturales in Madrid. Planned to be preserved in formaldehyde for display. Featured in 2003 documentary film Proyecto Kraken: En Busca del Calamar Gigante.
470	10 October 2002	El Agudo, Asturias, Spain {NEA}	Caught by ships	Architeuthis				WT: 87 kg		Guerra et al. (2006:259)		Caught by ships Luscinda and Peña la Deva.
	29 October 2002	north Tenerife, Canary Islands {NEA}	Recovered by fishermen, dead	Architeuthis dux	Entire?, "partially damaged"; possibly with incomplete limbs and missing posterior end of mantle, or only head and brachial crown	Beak (at least)		DML: 1309/1437 mm [estimated from LRL]; EL: 7.4 m [estimated from DML estimate]; LRL: 15.6 mm; URL: 14.5 mm; additional beak measurements	[specimen ID4 of Perales-Raya et al. (2020)]	Perales-Raya et al. (2020:359, 361, 365, figs. 1B, 2)		Beak increments used by Perales-Raya et al. (2020) to estimate age at 670 days. Beak preserved in 70% ethanol upon collection; rehydrated in distilled water for several days prior to age estimation.
471	23 December 2002	off Motobu Peninsula, Okinawa, Japan, at c. 500 m depth {NWP}	Caught by vertical long-line squid jig	Architeuthis sp.	Entire	Entire	Female	ML: 1410 mm	Okinawa Churaumi Aquarium	Kubodera & Horikawa (2005:206, pl. 1A); Kubodera (2007, fig. 1)		Donated to aquarium by local fisherman. According to Kubodera & Horikawa (2005), specimen belongs to morphological type with thick arms of medium length and longest arm IV measuring 1.2–1.3 times mantle length. Photographed lying alongside Ryukyu woman for size comparison.
(📷)	2002?	off Ogasawara Islands, Japan {NWP}	Sperm whale photographed at surface with tentacle in its mouth	"giant squid"	Tentacle	None		None given		Lazzerini (2013)		Photograph obtained by Tsunemi Kubodera; motivated his choice of Ogasawara Islands for giant squid search. Featured in BBC documentary "Giant Squid: Filming The Impossible", which also showed map of 23 giant squid records collected by Kubodera from east of Chichijima, mostly from depth of ~600 m.
472 (📷)	Unknown (reported 2003)	off Okinawa, Japan {NWP}	Photographed alive at surface	Architeuthis	Entire, seemingly in perfect condition; red skin fully intact	None?		None given		[Anon.] (c. 2003); O'Shea (2003g)	Eyden (2006); Kubodera (2010:39)	Photographed alive at surface after being attracted by jig-caught Thysanoteuthis. Possibly first adult giant squid to be photographed alive (but see #464).
473 (📷)	Unknown (reported 2003)	off Okinawa, Japan {NWP}	Photographed alive at surface	Architeuthis	Entire, seemingly in perfect condition; red skin fully intact	None?		None given		[Anon.] (c. 2003); O'Shea (2003g)	Eyden (2006); Kubodera (2010:39)	Photographed alive at surface with Megalocranchia. Possibly first adult giant squid to be photographed alive (but see #464). Countershading observed in Architeuthis for the first time.
474 (📷)	Unknown (reported 2003)	off Tonga {SWP}	Found floating at surface, dead	Architeuthis?	Entire, large gash in mantle near fins	None		ML: 2 m [estimate]		O'Shea (2003a); O'Shea (2007a)		Unsuccessful attempt made to haul specimen onto boat deck. Carcass was probably attacked by an animal, but was very fresh upon discovery. Photographs taken of floating carcass and severed arm. Steve O'Shea noted that suckers at base of arm fragment in photo appear unusually large relative to arm thickness for it to be Architeuthis, though he considered this the "most likely" ID, with the "only alternative" being a giant onychoteuthid, though he thought this unlikely due to the locality.
475	11 January 2003	off Nohara, Maizuru, Kyoto Prefecture, Japan {NWP}	Caught in large fixed net	giant squid (Note: Referred to by the Japanese equivalent "ダイオウイカ" (daiōika).)	Entire	Entire?		None given	National Museum of Nature and Science (Tokyo)	[Anon.] (2008a); [Anon.] (2008b)		
476	11 January 2003	off Madeira {NEA}	Seen clinging onto boat hull	Architeuthis dux	Entire	None		?EL: 7–8 m / nearly 30 ft (9.1 m) [estimate]; "tentacle [...] thicker than [...] leg"		[Anon.] (2003a)	Grann (2004)	Crew of trimaran Geronimo, competing in round-the-world Jules Verne Trophy, reported being "attacked" by giant squid several hours after departing from Brittany, France. Squid purportedly latched onto boat and blocked rudder with two of its "tentacles". First seen by first mate Didier Ragot, by shining flashlight through porthole. Also seen by captain Olivier de Kersauson, who stopped boat, causing squid to let go.
477	around 20 July 2003	Pringle Bay, Hermanus, Western Cape, South Africa {SEA}	Found washed ashore	Architeuthis	Entire, missing tentacles	Several pieces of bait, buccal mass, beak; remainder cut up for bait		?WL: 4 m [estimate]; WT: 200 kg [estimate]	Private collection of Jean Francis Avenier	Avenier (2003); Merwe (2003)		Found in shallows by four fishermen. Length estimated by fisherman Anton Barnard. Remains in possession of Hermanus squid enthusiast Jean Francis Avenier.
478 (📷)	August 2003	off New Zealand {SWP}	Caught in net	Architeuthis dux	Entire; tentacles intact	Entire	Male (mature)	EL: 6 m; ML: ~1 m; PL: 40 cm; LSD: 3 cm; WT: 49/60 kg	German Oceanographic Museum, Stralsund	[Anon.] (2004b); [Anon.] (2005a); Strauß & Reinicke (2007:87); [Anon.] (2010g); Nordsieck (N.d.); [Pottwale] (N.d.)		On public display. Acquired by Steve O'Shea who examined it with Volker Miske of the University of Greifswald. Spermatophores found embedded in tissue outside range of own penis, suggesting male-on-male mating. Transferred to German Oceanographic Museum in Stralsund in May 2004 where it was examined by Miske and Götz Reinicke; exhibited there in 6 m tank filled with formalin since 16 January 2005 as the first specimen on public display in Germany (unveiled at press event with Miske, Reinicke and museum manager Harald Benke).
479	13 September 2003	La Griega (Colunga), Asturias, Spain {NEA}	Found stranded on beach, dead	Architeuthis	Entire; "very fresh"		Female (immature)	ML: 153 cm; MT: 3.5 cm; ?EL: 11 m; WT: 140 kg		Guerra et al. (2004b:12, fig. 5); Guerra et al. (2006:259)	[Anon.] (2003b)	Preserved in 10% formalin two hours after discovery. Mantle exhibited severe tissue damage possibly caused by nearby geophysical prospecting employing air-gun arrays.
480	15 September 2003	La Isla (Colunga), Asturias, Spain {NEA}	Found washed ashore	Architeuthis dux	Entire?	Entire?	Female (immature)	ML: 152 cm; EL: 10 m/1200 cm; WT: 80 kg		Guerra et al. (2006:259); Bustamante et al. (2008)	[Anon.] (2003b)	Regarded by McClain et al. (2015) as "longest scientifically verified" and "largest recorded and well-preserved specimen in the contemporary, peer-reviewed literature". Tissues studied for concentrations of 14 trace elements. Digestive gland, gills, ink sac, branchial hearts, appendages, systemic heart, and brain removed during study.
481	16 September 2003	Gozón, Asturias, Spain [or off Gijón] {NEA}	Found floating at surface, dying	Architeuthis dux	Entire?	Entire?	Male (mature)	ML: 122 cm; EL: 620 cm; WT: 66 kg		Guerra et al. (2006:259); Bustamante et al. (2008)	[Anon.] (2003b)	Tissues studied for concentrations of 14 trace elements. Digestive gland, gills, ink sac, branchial hearts, appendages, systemic heart, and brain removed during study.
482	23 September 2003	Bañugues (Gozón), Asturias, Spain {NEA}	Found stranded	Architeuthis			Male (mature)	WT: 60 kg		Guerra et al. (2006:259)		
483	10 October 2003	Pozos- Carrandi, Asturias, Spain {NEA}	Caught by ships	Architeuthis				?EL: 10 m; WT: 67.5 kg		Guerra et al. (2006:259)		Caught by ships Travesía and Valdés Vega of Avilés.
484	16 October 2003 [or 16 September]	off Gijón, off coast of Asturias, Spain (43°53.23′N 5°32.15′W) {NEA}	Found moribund and floating at the surface	Architeuthis dux Steenstrup, 1857	Entire, missing tentacles	Entire	Male (mature)	ML: 122 cm; MW: 38 cm; WT: 66 kg; VML: 116 cm; HL: 28.9 cm; AC(I): 16.2 cm; AC(II): 20.4 cm; AC(III): 21.2 cm; AC(IV): 25.1 cm; AF: 4.3.2.1; FL: 42 cm; BC: 82 cm; EyD: 9.5/10.3 cm; FuL: 17 cm; FuD: 7.6 cm; FuCL: 14.5 cm; FuCW: 3.6 cm; PL: 96.5 cm; SSL: 32.9 cm; SoA: no obs.; SL: 12.3–20.1 cm; LRL: 1.34 cm; URL: 1.2 cm	CEPESMA	Guerra et al. (2004a); Guerra et al. (2004b:8)		
485	18 October 2003	La Griega (Colunga), Asturias, Spain {NEA}	Not specified	Architeuthis	Entire?, missing tentacles		Female	WT: 70 kg		Guerra et al. (2006:259)		
486 (📷)	Unknown (reported 2004)	off New Zealand, probably at 400–600 m depth {SWP}	By hoki trawl	Architeuthis dux	Mantle only; caecum distended with prey, including fragments of an Architeuthis tentacular club (carpus, manus and dactylus suckers, and dactylic pouch)		Female (mature)	ML: 1.6 m; additional measurements of Architeuthis remains found in caecum	Stomach contents accessioned into the Auckland University of Technology (AUT), Earth & Oceanic Sciences (EOS) Research Institute, accession # AUT G.22	Bolstad & O'Shea (2004:16)		Caught in one of two locations: either off the west coast of South Island, near Hokitika Canyon, between July and August; or off Banks Peninsula, on the east coast of South Island, between December and February. Contents of caecum examined. Prey items attributed to Nototodarus sp. and Architeuthis dux. Presence of Architeuthis remains in caecum suggests cannibalism or autophagy.
487 (📷)	15 March 2004	15.6 km NW of Port Stephens Settlement, Falkland Islands (~2 km from coast; 52.03°S 61.41°W) at 200/220 m depth {SWA}	By bottom trawl, caught alive	Architeuthis dux Steenstrup, 1857	Entire, almost complete	Entire	Female?	EL: 8.62 m; WT: >200 kg	BMNH; reg. no. 20040669	[Anon.] (2006a); Morelle (2006); Paterson (2008:181, fig.); Ablett (2012:16); Hendry (2015); Bonnett (2015); Westwood (2015); King (2019:143, 149)	Hann (2006); Choudhury (2014); Colwell (2015); Lamb (2018:50); Prasad (2021); numerous media sources	On public display. Nicknamed "Archie". Caught by Falkland-registered trawler John Cheek (Fortuna Ltd.); immediately frozen. Donated by Alexander Arkhipkin of Falkland Islands Fisheries Department. Preservation overseen by mollusc curator Jonathan Ablett. DNA samples taken. Defrosted over 3 days and then measured by museum scientist Oliver Crimmen. Next injected with ~15 litres of 10% formol-saline solution and placed in purpose-built wooden container lined with rubber, filled with 3250 litres of water, 350 litres of formalin, and 125 kg of rock salt. Finally transferred to 9.45 m-long acrylic tank filled with 10% formol-saline solution. On display in undissected state at Darwin Centre, BMNH, but only viewable to public as part of behind-the-scenes tour (initially free 30-minute Darwin Centre Explore tour, later expanded into paid 45-minute Spirit Collection Tour; see photos). Central to plot of 2010 fantasy novel Kraken. Featured in "Life in the Dark", 2014 episode of documentary series David Attenborough's Natural Curiosities, and in 2021 episode of documentary series Natural History Museum: World of Wonder.
488 (📷)	15 April 2004	southeast of Okinawa Island, Japan {NWP}	Photographed alive at surface	Architeuthis	Entire, seemingly in perfect condition; red skin fully intact	None		ML: 2 m [estimate]; ?WL: 5–6 m [estimate]	None	[Anon.] (2004a)	Eyden (2006); Kubodera (2010:39)	
489	11 August 2004	off Arguineguín, southern Gran Canaria, Canary Islands {NEA}	Caught by fishermen	Architeuthis dux	Entire; tentacle(s) intact	Entire		EL: 8.5 m; WT: 83/85 kg	Instituto Canario de Ciencias Marinas, Telde	[Anon.] (2004c); Alcalá (2004)		Taken to Instituto Canario de Ciencias Marinas (ICCM) in Telde for study, with necropsy planned for winter. Identification provided by Patricia Navajas of ICCM.
490 (📷)	11 August 2004	between Fuerteventura, Canary Islands and Morocco {NEA}	Found by Salvamento Marítimo	Architeuthis dux	Mantle only?	Entire		ML: 1 m	Instituto Canario de Ciencias Marinas, Telde	[Anon.] (2004c); Alcalá (2004)		Taken to Instituto Canario de Ciencias Marinas (ICCM) in Telde for study, with necropsy planned for winter. Identification provided by Patricia Navajas of ICCM.
491 (📷)	23 August 2004 (morning)	3 km from lighthouse, Ocean Beach, Farewell Spit, New Zealand {SWP}	Found washed ashore	Architeuthis	Entire	Entire		?WL: 5.7 m; WT: "near" 300 kg	Auckland University of Technology	[Anon.] (2004d); [Anon.] (2004e); [Anon.] (2004f)	[Anon.] (2007e)	Reportedly largest known giant squid specimen. Found by British tourists Nick and Rosemary Pinfield on Farewell Spit Tours trip. Transferred to Steve O'Shea of Auckland University of Technology on 25 August. Available for public viewing at university on 11 October.
492 (📷)	30 September 2004 (beginning 9:15 am)	off Chichijima Island, Ogasawara Islands, Japan (26°57.3′N 142°16.8′E), initially at 900 m depth, then up to c. 600 m, and finally down to c. 1000 m {NWP}	https://wayback.archive-it.org/all/20140303163726/http://www.marinebio.org/upload/_cephs/Architeuthis-dux/4.jpg alive in natural habitat	Architeuthis	Entire; live animal sighted and photographed	5.5 m long portion of tentacle attached to line; squid broke free and swam away		Recovered tentacle: 5.5 m long; TCL: 720 mm; LSD: 28 mm; ML: 1615 mm [estimate based on TCL]; ML: 1709 mm [estimate based on LSD]; WL: ~4.7 m [estimate]; EL: >8 m [estimate]		Kubodera & Mori (2005); Owen (2005); Hopkin (2005); [Anon.] (2005c, 3 figs.); [Anon.] (2005d); Staedter (2005); Morelli (2005); King (2005:21); Martin (2006); Kubodera (2007); Kubodera (2010:25)	Ellis (2005:xvii); Dery (2013); Sakamoto (2013b); Cronin (2016); Hanlon & Messenger (2018:266); numerous media sources	First images of live giant squid in its natural deep-water habitat. Line baited with squid and shrimp. Feeding behaviour observed; "Architeuthis appears to be a much more active predator than previously suspected, using its elongate feeding tentacles to strike and tangle prey". Distal tentacle portion was still functioning upon retrieval at surface, with club suckers "repeatedly gripping the boat deck and any offered fingers". Press event with Tsunemi Kubodera held at Tokyo's National Museum of Nature and Science. Subject of 2006 Discovery Channel documentary Giant Squid: Caught on Camera.
493 (📷)	5 December 2004 [or 6 December]	near the Red Rock local landmark, Ghaneys Beach, Colliers, Conception Bay, Newfoundland (47°28.747′N 53°11.515′W) [or 47°27′N 53°14′W] {NWA}	Found stranded on rocks, ~1 ft (30 cm) above sea level	Architeuthis dux	Entire; missing skin		Female (maturing)	ML: 131 cm; ?EL: 18 ft (5.5 m); WT: 90 kg	[specimen No. 22 of Roper et al. (2015)]	[DFO] (2005); McGrath (2005); "Flynnsbeach" (2013); Roper et al. (2015:81)	Daily Planet special, January 2005; King (2005:21)	Found and first reported by Jimmy Conway of Colliers. Photographed with Dennis Flynn at 10:45 pm (local time) on 5 December 2004; measured in situ and collected by Paul O'Driscoll and Bob Richard later that night; turned over to Fisheries and Oceans Canada (DFO) following day. Necropsied by DFO scientist Earl Dawe on 11 January 2005 at Northwest Atlantic Fisheries Centre in St. John's together with other Newfoundland specimen from December 2004. Material found in stomach; digestive tract frozen for later study. Stranding possibly linked to unusually warm waters.
494 (📷)	22 December 2004	Badger Bay, Triton, Green Bay, Newfoundland (49°31′N 55°37′W) {NWA}	Found floating at surface near shore	Architeuthis dux	Entire; missing skin		Male (maturing)	"total length": 405 cm	[specimen No. 23 of Roper et al. (2015)]	[DFO] (2005); McGrath (2005); Roper et al. (2015:81); [Anon.] (2018)	Daily Planet special, January 2005; King (2005:21)	Found by Derwin Roberts of Triton. Necropsied by DFO research scientist Earl Dawe on 11 January 2005 at Northwest Atlantic Fisheries Centre in St. John's together with other Newfoundland specimen from December 2004. Stranding possibly linked to unusually warm waters.
495 (📷)	2005 [or 2003/2004]	off southern coast of South Island, New Zealand, at 500 m depth {SWP}	Caught in net for hoki	Architeuthis sanctipauli	Entire; tentacles intact	Entire	Male? (subadult?)	EL: 6.75 m; WT: 250 kg [estimate]	Queensland Museum	Holroyd (2005); Morelli (2006); [Anon.] (2006h); Pearce (2006); [QM] (2010); Sykes & Begley (2014); Kent (2014); [QM] (2014); [QM] (2020)	Janetzki (2014)	On public display. Nicknamed "Cal". Displayed in 3.5-tonne block of ice that took 3 weeks to freeze (reported as largest man-made ice block in the world; prepared by Melbourne company Donohoes Ice), initially at Melbourne Aquarium as part of "Monsters of the Deep" exhibit (from 26 December 2005), later at UnderWater World as part of exhibit of the same name (from 27 December 2006). Originally purchased by Melbourne Aquarium curator Nick Kirby; total cost including transportation and preservation in ice block exceeded A$100,000 (equivalent to US$76,000 in 2025). Donated in frozen state to Queensland Museum in 2008; ice chipped away over 3 days, specimen then thawed over a week, preserved in formalin, and placed in ethanol for storage in large fibreglass tank. After more than 5 years in museum lab, transferred from ethanol to glycerol for public display as part of "Deep Oceans" exhibit (28 March – 6 October 2014), later on level 2 (from 17 December 2014).
496	2005 (summer)	Long Beach, Pacific Rim National Park Reserve, near Tofino, Vancouver Island, British Columbia, Canada (49°04.185′N 125°45.679′W) {NEP}	Found washed ashore	Architeuthis dux	Entire; "poor condition"; all arms and tentacles damaged and incomplete (both tentacular clubs missing), mantle torn open and bearing row of sperm whale teeth holes, most internal organs missing	Entire	(juvenile)	ML: 960 mm; EL: 2340 mm; WT: 22,600 g [wet]; MW: 780 mm; HL: 410 mm; HW: 360 mm [across eyes]; EyD: 40 mm; TL: 1270/1105 mm; AL(I): 1165/1430 mm; AL(II): 940/810 mm; AL(III): 805/710 mm; AL(IV): 745/700 mm; AD(I): 180/200 mm; AD(II): 180/180 mm; AD(III): 195/180 mm; AD(IV): 150/140 mm; BAC: 280 mm; BAL: 135 mm	Royal British Columbia Museum (RBCM 006-00085-001)	Cosgrove & Sendall (2007); Horner (2009); Cosgrove (2013)		Found by Parks Canada staff. Photographed on beach by Heather Holmes. Beak and radula extracted for identification. Identification of specimen as A. dux confirmed by Steve O'Shea. Apparently attacked and killed by a sperm whale.
497	2 July 2005	10 miles (16 km) south of Key West, Florida, United States (Straits of Florida) (coordinates given as "~24°32'N 81°84'W" [sic]) {NWA}	Found floating at surface	Architeuthis dux	Entire; "whole specimen"			WL: ~10 ft (3.0 m)	[specimen No. 24 of Roper et al. (2015)]	Roper et al. (2015:81)		Found over bottom depth of 592 m. Identified based on photo.
498 (📷)	19 July 2005	12 miles (19 km) or 16 miles (26 km) off Gandia, Valencia, western Mediterranean Sea {MED}	By trawl	Architeuthis dux	Entire	Entire	Male (mature)	ML: 107 cm; EL: 600 cm; WT: 50 kg	CEPESMA	[Anon.] (2005b); Bustamante et al. (2008); [Anon.] (2014d); [Anon.] (2014e)	[Anon.] (2013b)	First male specimen from Mediterranean and third overall. Caught by fishing boat Nova Emi comprising skipper and owner Andrés Cánovas and three others. Taken to Grau de Gandia fish market off Playa de Piles and auctioned to Piles fishmonger Jesús Caudeli, who intended to display it, for 37 euro (equivalent to US$46 in 2025). Initially offered to University of Valencia, who rejected it; donated to CEPESMA. Tissues studied for concentrations of 14 trace elements. Digestive gland, gills, ink sac, branchial hearts, appendages, systemic heart, and brain removed during study. One of few CEPESMA specimens at Museo del Calamar Gigante not destroyed during storm of 2 February 2014. On temporary display in Biarritz from June 2014.
499	22 July 2005	off Gijón, Asturias, Spain {NEA}	By trawl	Architeuthis dux	Entire?	Entire?	Female (maturing)	ML: 146 cm; EL: 820 cm; WT: 139 kg		Bustamante et al. (2008)		Tissues studied for concentrations of 14 trace elements. Digestive gland, gills, ink sac, branchial hearts, appendages, systemic heart, and brain removed during study.
500 (📷)	24 October 2005	off beach in Los Cristianos, Tenerife, Canary Islands {NEA}	Found floating near beach, dead	Architeuthis	Entire; large bite in fin area, viscera missing		Unknown (immature)	EL: 7/7.5 m		[Anon.] (2005e); [Anon.] (2005f)	[Anon.] (2009a)	Studied by scientists of Investigadores del Centro Oceanográfico de Canarias (part of Spanish Institute of Oceanography) led by Pedro Pascual. Sex could not be determined due to absence of viscera. Bite in mantle caused by medium-sized cetacean such as pilot whale; may have killed squid or occurred after death.
501	27 January 2006	Southport Lagoon, Tasmania, Australia {SWP}	Found stranded on beach	Architeuthis sp.	Entire?	None; not collected		None given		[TMAG] (2007:20)		Not collected by Tasmanian Museum and Art Gallery as location only accessible by "a team of 4WDs".
502 (📷)	11 February 2006	~20 m in front of Sinmyeong Gumbau breakwater, Sinmyeong-dong, Buk-gu, Ulsan, South Korea {NWP}	Caught	giant squid (Note: Referred to by the Korean equivalent "대왕오징어" (daewangojingeo) or "대형오징어" (daehyeongojingeo).)	Entire; tentacles and reddish skin missing	Not stated		WL: 3 m; WT: 14 kg		B.-S. Kwon (2006); S.-H. Lee (2006)		Spotted and caught by local Kwon Cheong-geun while leaving for seaweed collection at 8:30 am. First such specimen seen by fishery market officials. Sold for 100,000 won (equivalent to US$105 in 2025) after "fierce" bidding at agricultural and fishery market on day of capture. Announced by Ulsan's Buk-gu office the following day.
503 (📷)	~March 2006 ["six months" prior to 23 September]	off West Coast of South Island, New Zealand {SWP}	By trawl	"giant squid"	Entire, "largely intact, albeit with a few battle scars"; tentacles intact	Entire	Male? (mature)	EL: 8.23 m; TL: 5 m; WT: 100 kg		Coursey (2006)		Nicknamed "Squid Vicious". Supplied by Steve O'Shea. Formerly on public display in 3.8 m tank at Kelly Tarlton's Underwater World in Auckland, New Zealand, as part of "Freaky Fish" exhibit from 23 September 2006; partly preserved but displayed in chilled sea water (10–18 °C) in new experimental approach.
504	7 May 2006	Florida Current, 9.7 miles (15.6 km) offshore, New Smyrna Beach, Florida, United States (29°01′N 80°56′W) {NWA}	Found floating at surface	Architeuthis dux	"most of mantle missing"			"total length": 13 ft (4.0 m)	[specimen No. 25 of Roper et al. (2015)]	Roper et al. (2015:81)		Most of mantle bitten off by mako shark. Sample used as part of mitogenomic study of Winkelmann et al. (2013).
505	11 August 2006	near seamount ~8 miles (13 km) east of Santa Cruz Island, California, United States {NEP}	Found floating at surface	Architeuthis japonica	Single tentacle and two arms	Entire?; stored in cooler after being found		TL: ~13 ft (4.0 m); TD: "about the diameter of a broomstick"; AL: ~4 ft (1.2 m); ASD: "about the size of a nickel"; EL: ~20 ft (6.1 m) [estimate]	Santa Barbara Museum of Natural History	[Anon.] (2006c); Thomas (2006)		Found by sport fisherman Bennett Salvay from Tarzana, Los Angeles, along with son Daniel and nephew Evan. Described as "very fresh". Eric Hochberg of Santa Barbara Museum of Natural History suggested specimen may have been partially eaten by a sperm whale or killer whale.
506 (📷)	August/October? 2006 (caught 2 or 4 months prior to being reported on 21 December)	Pacific Ocean, about 900 nautical miles (1,700 km) northwest of Hawaii (35°30′N 168°20′W) {NWP}	Found floating at surface; caught with fishing spear	Architeuthis	Entire	Entire		BL+HL?: 3 m; BC: 1.5 m; ?EL: 6/7 m; WT: 211 kg		Hong (2006); [Anon.] (2006i)	China Times, 21 December 2006; [Anon.] (2013h); Lee (2013)	Caught by skipper Hong Jeh Shan and mechanic Hong Shih Cheng (who came to global prominence in 2013 as the only fatality in the Guang Da Xing No. 28 incident). Took 7 fishermen nearly an hour to bring aboard. Kept in freezer for months prior to being reported. Identified as giant squid by C. C. Wu of the Taiwan Department of Fish and Game. Photographed separately with kindergarten children and with Hong Chieh Shang, son-in-law of Hong Shih Cheng. Transported to Donggang fish market on 20 December where sold at auction for 17,000 yuan or around US$530 (equivalent to $846 in 2025) to fishmonger Mr. Huang of Wumiao, Kaohsiung City, for subsequent slaughter and sale. Capture date also incorrectly reported as December 2006.
507 (📷)	19 November 2006 (reported)	off Geoje Island, South Gyeongsang Province, South Korea {NWP}	Caught in net	giant squid	Entire; tentacles intact	Not stated		EL: 7.4 m; ?WL: >3 m; WT: >100 kg		[Anon.] (2006d); [Anon.] (2006e); [Anon.] (2006f)		Sold for 400,000 won (equivalent to US$419 in 2025) at Busan Cooperative Fish Market. Sent directly to main branch of Shinsegae department store in Seoul where displayed in sea food section on morning of 19 November and priced at around 1,000,000 won (equivalent to US$1047 in 2025). Estimated to be more than 50 years old [sic] according to contemporary reports.
508 (📷)	4 December 2006	~15 miles (24 km) northeast of Otohto-jima Island, Ogasawara Islands, Japan, at 650 m depth {NWP}	Caught on baited hook; filmed alive at surface; brought aboard research vessel "after putting up quite a fight"; died in process	Architeuthis sp.	Entire; tentacles and several arm tips missing	Entire	Female (immature)	ML: 1.43 m; EL: ~7 m [estimate]; BL+HL: 3.5 m; WT: nearly 50 kg		Talmadge (2006); de Pastino (2006); [Reuters] (2007); Kubodera (2010:38); Nilsson et al. (2012:Supplemental Information)	Dery (2013); Sakamoto (2013b); numerous media sources	First video of live adult giant squid. Specimen was hooked when it attempted to eat a neon flying squid (Ommastrephes bartramii; c. 55 cm ML), which was itself attracted by bait of Japanese flying squid (Todarodes pacificus; c. 25 cm ML). Countershading and forceful ejection of water observed at surface. Sexual maturity determined based on immature ovary. Carcass preserved in formalin displayed at news conference at National Museum of Nature and Science in Tokyo on 22 December. Eye preserved in 4% formalin; sections of retina embedded in histological Araldite used by Nilsson et al. (2012) to measure rhabdom diameter (5–6 μm).
	December 2006	off Suzu-shi, Ishikawa Prefecture, Japan {NWP}	Caught	giant squid				None given		[Anon.] (2014o)		
509 (📷)	21 December 2006	3 miles (4.8 km) east of Jukbyeon Port, Jukbyeon-myeon, Uljin-gun, North Gyeongsang Province, South Korea {NWP}	Caught in fixed net	giant squid	Entire; tentacles intact	None?		EL: 7.8 m [also reported as 8 m]; BL: 1.8 m; BC: 1.1 m		[Anon.] (2006j); G.-Y. Lee (2006); M.-D. Lee (2007)	[Anon.] (2007a)	Caught at dawn by 21-ton Haedong No. 5 captained by Kim Chang-yong; landed in Jukbyeon Port. Failed to sell at auction; cut up on-site by Haedong No. 5 shipowner Jo Okhwa. First recorded specimen from area according to Park Cheol-eon, former chairman of Jukbyeon-myeon. Dried specimen displayed in Hupo Fish Market, Hupo-myeon, Uljin-gun, in January 2007.
510 (📷)	7 January 2007	entrance of Yangpo Port breakwater, Pohang, North Gyeongsang Province, South Korea {NWP}	Found floating at surface, alive	giant squid	Entire, largely undamaged; tentacles intact	None?		EL: 6.2 m; BL: 1.6 m		[Anon.] (2007a)		Found alive around 8 am by visitor who came to watch sunrise with family; pulled to shore with help of several people and soon died. Discoverer photographed with severed arm. Remains taken to nearby restaurant to be cooked and eaten; mantle flesh reported to be 8 cm thick.
511	24 January 2007	off Washizaki, Ine, Kyoto Prefecture, Japan {NWP}	Caught in small fixed net, escaped	giant squid	Entire	None		None given		[Anon.] (2008a)		
512 (📷)	June 2007	off southern Tenerife, Canary Islands {NEA}	Pilot whale observed at surface with a tentacle in its mouth	Architeuthis?	Tentacle	None		EL: 4–5 m [estimate]; TL: >2 m [estimate]; WT: 180 kg [estimate]		[Anon.] (2007f); Soto et al. (2008); Walker (2008)		Pilot whale made several side jumps to release tentacle and eat it. Photographed by Pablo Aspas; video also recorded. Led scientists to suggest that pilot whales may feed on giant squid. Size estimates by teuthologist Ángel Guerra. Piece of "fresh" arm and other remains also found near diving pilot whales.
513	2007 (reported; collection date unknown)	Western Tasmania, Australia {SWP}	Not stated	Architeuthis sp.	Entire?	Beak and radula only		None given	NMV catalog no. MV F83586	[TMAG] (2007:21)		
514 (📷)	10 July 2007	Ocean Beach, near Strahan, Tasmania, Australia {SWP}	Found washed ashore	Architeuthis	Entire; head and arms separated from mantle, tentacles and tips of arms missing	Entire	Female?	ML: 1.73 m; HL+AL: 1.4 m; EL: ~6–8 m [estimate; with tentacles]; BD: ~1 m; WT: 150 kg [estimate; when collected] or ~200/250 kg [estimate; when alive]	TMAG catalog no. E26108	[TMAG] (2007:1, 20, figs. 1–18); [Anon.] (2007b); [Anon.] (2007c); [Anon.] (2007h)	Numerous media sources	Found in "very fresh" state (probably c. 24 hours after stranding). Photographed in situ with Ritchie Bauer of the Tasmanian Museum and Art Gallery (TMAG). Presumed female on basis of spermatophores embedded near base of arms, but no other reproductive tissues present. Muscle tissue and statolith collected by Greta Pecl of Tasmanian Aquaculture and Fisheries Institute. Mantle and arm tissue samples taken by TMAG staff before transfer to Hobart; preserved in 95% ethanol. Specimen kept in formalin for a month before being preserved in ethanol. Collection, examination and preservation detailed in TMAG report.
515 (📷)	22 or 23 July 2007 (morning)	~6 km from base of spit, Ocean Beach, Farewell Spit, New Zealand {SWP}	Found washed ashore	Architeuthis	Entire?			?EL: 4.2 m		[Anon.] (2007d); [Anon.] (2007e)		Found by members of Farewell Spit Eco Tours including Mike Gillooly, with whom photographed.
516 (📷)	8 August 2007 [or 9 August]	Marathon Hump, south of Marathon, Florida Keys, Florida, United States (Straits of Florida) {NWA}	Found floating at surface	Architeuthis dux?	Entire, "completely intact"; both eyes and all arms and tentacles intact		Male (immature)	EL: 6.79 ft (2.07 m); WT: 2.7 lb (1.2 kg)	Mote Marine Laboratory [specimen No. 26 of Roper et al. (2015)]	Lollar (2007); [Anon.] (2007g); [Anon.] (2007l); Roper et al. (2015:81)		Possibly the smallest and most intact giant squid found in the region. Recovered by David Stout of North Fort Myers while fishing for tuna and mahi-mahi aboard Concrete Gringo in 1,200 ft (370 m) of water. Kept on ice by Stout before being transported to Mote Marine Laboratory, where it was examined and tentatively identified by Debi Ingrao. Estimated to be only 6 months old. Preserved in formalin. Sample used as part of mitogenomic study of Winkelmann et al. (2013).
517 (📷)	21 August 2007 (reported)	New Zealand {SWP}	By trawl	Architeuthis	Entire, missing tentacles			EL: ~10 m [estimate]		Bolstad (2007)		Submerged in and injected with 5% formalin after thawing. Eyes in very good condition.
[10] (📷)	23 August 2007 (reported)	off Elba, Italy {MED}	Caught in a deep sea net by fisherman	Architeuthis; Thysanoteuthis rhombus Troschel, 1857	Entire, with mature eggs		Female (mature)	EL: 1.7 m; WT: 17.6 kg	Marine Biology Laboratory, Livorno, Italy	[Anon.] (2007i); [Anon.] (2007j); [Anon.] (2007k)		Non-architeuthid. Identified by Paolo Sartor. Specimen retrieved in "excellent condition".
518 (📷)	29 August 2007 (reported)	beach in Port Underwood, New Zealand {SWP}	Found washed ashore; likely discarded by a trawler	Architeuthis	Entire, missing tentacles			?WL: ~3 m; EL: ~4 m [estimate]		Johnston (2007)		Found by retired whaler Ted Perano.
519 (📷)	25 October 2007	off Macaé, Rio de Janeiro, Brazil {SWA}	Caught by fishermen	Architeuthis	Entire	None?		?EL: ~4 m; WT: 130 kg		[Anon.] (2007m); Torres (2007); Serrão (2007)	Martins & Perez (2009)	Purchased day after capture by merchant Alessandro Mello for 530 reais (equivalent to US$272 in 2025). Taken to Niterói to be sold for 9 reais per kilo (equivalent to US$5 in 2025) at São Pedro seafood market. Martins & Perez (2009) wrote: "the fate of this specimen is currently unknown".
520 (📷)	14 December 2007	off Geumjin-ri, Ganggu-myeon, Yeongdeok-gun, North Gyeongsang Province, South Korea {NWP}	Caught in fishing net	giant squid	Entire; tentacles intact, reddish skin largely missing	Entire		EL: 7.27 m [originally reported as ~6 m]; BL: 1.6 m; BC: 1 m; WT: >100 kg	National Institute of Fisheries Science	[Anon.] (2007n); Jang (2007); Bang (2007); G.-S. Lee (2007)		Caught at 8 am. Lifted onto ship using large crane due to weight. Initially sold at fisheries market in Ganggu Port for only 30,000 won (equivalent to US$32 in 2025) due to lack of freshness and was to go to large restaurant (said to be enough food for >50 people) but was purchased again by National Institute of Fisheries Science for research purposes and moved to Pohang.
521 (📷)	27 December 2007	beach near mouth of Yura River, Maizuru, Kyoto Prefecture, Japan {NWP}	Found washed ashore	giant squid	Entire	Entire?	Female (mature)	?EL: 3.3–3.7 m; ML: ~1.8 m; WT: 100 kg [estimate]	National Museum of Nature and Science (Tokyo)	[Anon.] (2008a); [Anon.] (2008b)		Somewhat damaged; portion cut off with knife. Initially frozen at the Kyoto Prefectural Marine Center. Dissection carried out on 4 February 2008.
522	February 2008	off Sazanami-cho, Nanao-shi, Ishikawa Prefecture, Japan {NWP}	Caught	giant squid				None given		[Anon.] (2014o)		
523 (📷)	9 May 2008 (reported)	40 km off Hickory Bay, Banks Peninsula, New Zealand, at 112 m depth {SWP}	By trawl	"giant squid"	Mantle and tentacles, head missing			ML: 2 m; TL: 4 m		Brown (2008)		Caught by trawler Austro Carina. Head lost when caught in net. Capture of squid described by Lyttelton skipper Dale Robertson.
524 (📷)	25 May 2008	25 nautical miles (46 km) SW of Portland, Victoria, Australia (38.6767°S 141.227°E) at 550/556 m depth {SWP}	By trawl	Architeuthis dux	Entire; eyes, skin and fins intact	Entire	Female	?EL: 5.5–6 m; EL: >12 m [intact estimate]; WT: 245 kg	NMV catalog no. MV F150161	Burgess (2008); [Anon.] (2008e); [Anon.] (2008f); McNamara (2008); [Anon.] (2008g); [Anon.] (2008i); [MV] (2013b)		Said to be largest recorded specimen from Australian waters. Caught by trawler Zeehaan skippered by Rangi Pene. Identified as "colossal squid" in some early reports. Publicly dissected at Melbourne Museum on 17 July 2008 by team of experts led by Mark Norman. Preserved in 70% ethanol and 5% formalin buffered with tetraborate.
525 (📷)	25 June 2008	about 20 miles (32 km) off Santa Cruz, Monterey Bay, California, United States {NEP}	Found floating at surface with gulls feeding on remains	Architeuthis	Entire; missing parts of mantle, most of one tentacle, eyes, sex organs, stomach, ink sac, and heart	Entire		EL: ~25 ft (7.6 m) [estimate]; ?WL: 16 ft (4.9 m); BC: 4 ft (1.2 m); WT: ~170 lb (77 kg); WT: 225–390 lb (102–177 kg) [intact estimate]	Santa Barbara Museum of Natural History	Alexander (2008); Rusk (2008); Hirschmann (2008); [Anon.] (2008h); Kettmann (2008); Meyers (2011); Williams (2011)	Hajicek (2008)	Found by Santa Cruz researcher Sean Van Sommeran and other crew of the Pelagic Shark Research Foundation. Possibly died as a result of shark attack. Numerous photographs taken of specimen in water, during retrieval, on boat deck, and during dissection. Dissected on 26 June 2008 at Long Marine Lab by team including William Gilly, Ken Baltz, and John Field. Specimen was measured, checked for parasites, and tissue samples were taken. Examined again on 22 August at the Santa Barbara Museum of Natural History. Covered in 2011 book Kraken: The Curious, Exciting, and Slightly Disturbing Science of Squid.
526 (📷)	16 October 2008	"beginning" of Farewell Spit, New Zealand {SWP}	Found washed ashore	Architeuthis	Entire	Entire?	Female?	?EL: 5 m; WT: ~200 kg	Auckland University of Technology	Holst (2008); Rowe (2008)	Gale (2011)	Found around 3:30 pm by team including Chris Pomeroy and Tim Rowe of Farewell Spit Eco Tours. Transferred in refrigerated truck by Department of Conservation to Steve O'Shea at Auckland University of Technology. Viewed by children from three local primary schools prior to transfer.
527	2009 (reported)	Kerguelen waters {SIO}	Found in stomach contents of sleeper shark (Somniosus sp.)	Architeuthis dux	Lower beak	Entire	(adult)	LRL: 16.2 mm		Xavier & Cherel (2009:51, fig. 5)		
528	2009 (reported)	Kerguelen waters {SIO}	Found in stomach contents of sleeper shark (Somniosus sp.)	Architeuthis dux	Lower beak	Entire	(juvenile)	LRL: 10.1 mm		Xavier & Cherel (2009:51, fig. 5)		
529	2009 (reported)	Kerguelen waters {SIO}	Found in stomach contents of sleeper shark (Somniosus sp.)	Architeuthis dux	Upper beak	Entire		URL: 18.1 mm		Xavier & Cherel (2009:82, fig. 5)		
530	19 February 2009 (reported; first seen several days prior)	Charco Manso, El Hierro, Canary Islands {NEA}	Found floating at surface; later washed ashore, dead	Architeuthis	Entire?			"large size"		[Anon.] (2009a)		Analysed and identified by members of Instituto Español de Oceanografía.
531 (📷)	2 April 2009	Island Bay beach, New Zealand {SWP}	Found in shallow water; dragged onto beach	"giant squid"	Entire; "fantastic condition"	Entire	Male?	?EL: 3 m	NMNZ	Paulin (2009); Wood & Easton (2009)		Found by Alana Spragg and Bella Spragg. Probably died only a few hours before being found. Thought to be either a male or a juvenile due to small size.
532 (📷)	30 July 2009	off Louisiana, United States (Gulf of Mexico) (26.98°N 90.37°W) at 475 m depth {NWA}	Caught in research cruise trawl net	Architeuthis dux	Entire, "intact"	Entire	Female	EL: 19.5 ft (5.9 m); WT: 103 lb (46.7 kg)	NMNH catalog no. MOL 1130046 [specimen No. 27 of Roper et al. (2015)]	Melvin (2009); Schleifstein (2009); Viegas (2009); [Anon.] (2009c); Roper et al. (2015:81); Orrell (N.d.)	Roper & Shea (2013:115, 117, figs. 5a–c, 8); Boatman (2014)	Second specimen from Gulf of Mexico after #131. Caught by NOAA research vessel Gordon Gunter during 60-day scientific study into sperm whale prey led by Anthony Martinez (summer cruise TM # 2053904; MMS-SWAPS/073009-Trawl). Capture announced by Department of the Interior on 21 September. Stomach contents examined and found to contain mostly fluid with few solid remains. White tissue on posterior tip of ink sac interpreted as putative light organ. Preserved in isopropyl alcohol. Sample used as part of mitogenomic study of Winkelmann et al. (2013).
[11]	15 August 2009	near a small bay just west of Beaver Point on Saltspring Island, Canada {NEP}	Found floating at surface	Architeuthis dux; Moroteuthis robusta (now known as Onykia robusta; see Bolstad, 2008:106, 2010)	Entire	Entire; "badly decomposed"	(juvenile)	?EL: 11 ft (3.4 m)		Horner (2009)		Non-architeuthid. Found by Saanich residents Karia Leschke and Ron Lysek on their boat Stealaway. Identified (and re-identified) by invertebrate research biologist Graham Gillespie. Reported on 5 October.
(📷)	23 September 2009 (reported)	off Morocco {NEA}	Caught by longline	giant squid (Note: Referred to by the Portuguese equivalent lula gigante.)	Entire; tentacles intact	Entire		BL: ~2 m; EL: 7 m; TL: 5.5 m; WT: 83 kg		[Anon.] (2009b)		Caught by fishing boat Ribamar owned by José Carlos and registered at Baleeira port in Sagres, Portugal. On 23 September taken from Sagres fish market to Gambelas campus of University of Algarve for study. Described by cephalopod specialist Teresa Borges as of "great importance to science".
	October 2009 (caught several days prior to 14 October)	Carrandi fishing grounds, Spain {NEA}	By trawl, alive	Architeuthis	Entire, "optimal" condition; eyes intact	Entire	Female	WT: 60 kg	CEPESMA	[Anon.] (2009d); Cascudo (2009)	[Anon.] (2009e)	Caught by Celeiro-based trawler Minchos VI. Reported on 16 October; necropsy initially planned for following week but later delayed. Unusual for having intact eyes.
(📷)	14 October 2009	1 mile (1.6 km) off Playa de Niembro, Llanes, Asturias, Spain {NEA}	Found floating at surface, alive; later found floating at surface, dead	Architeuthis	Entire, "optimal" condition; eyes intact	Entire		WT: 40 kg	CEPESMA	[Anon.] (2009d); Cascudo (2009); [Anon.] (2009e)		First spotted alive by kayaker from Barros who was unable to collect it but returned to shore to contact CEPESMA about find through 112 emergency number; could not relocate specimen as swept away by currents. Search operation launched involving firefighters and Guardia Civil from Llanes, Salvamento Marítimo, and local residents. Found dead by canoeist later same day at 6:40 pm near Llanes port. Transferred to fish market where frozen awaiting transfetr to CEPESMA facilities in Luarca; necropsy planned for following week, later pushed back to first week of December; said to be first for specimen with intact eyes.
533 (📷)	14 October 2009	off Bonin Islands, Japan {NWP}	Found floating at surface	Architeuthis	Single tentacle			TL: 3.5 m		Hansford (2009); Wu (2009a); Wu (2009b)		Found and measured by Tony Wu.
534 (📷)	15 October 2009	off Bonin Islands, Japan {NWP}	Female sperm whale photographed near surface carrying giant squid remains in her jaws	Architeuthis	Remains	None		?EL: 9 m [estimate]		Hansford (2009)		Group of five adult sperm whales and one calf photographed by Tony Wu. Steve O'Shea suggested adult whales may use remains of giant squid to teach calves how to hunt.
535	2010	Fosa de Hércules, off Province of A Coruña, Spain {NEA}	By trawl	Architeuthis	Entire?	Not stated		None given		[Anon.] (2011b); [Anon.] (2011c)		Caught by the trawler Minchos VI. Both this specimen and another caught by Minchos VI in April 2011 were noted for differing anatomically from other Spanish giant squid specimens.
536 (📷)	15 January 2010	Sinchang-ri, Janggi-myeon, Nam-gu, Pohang, North Gyeongsang Province, South Korea {NWP}	Found stranded on beach	Architeuthis sp.	Entire; tentacles intact, skin largely missing		Female	ML: 1750 mm; TL: 5060 mm; AL(I): 1550/1560 mm; AL(II): 1420/1560 mm; AL(III): 1620/1730 mm; AL(IV): 1500/1410 mm; LSD: 20 mm; MT: 30.6–40.2 mm; HL: 310 mm; HW: 230 mm; EyD: 50 mm; FL: 594 mm; FW: 545 mm; GiL: 460 mm; WT: 2764 g [ovary]; WT: 1290 g [stomach]		J.-H. Choi (2011); Lee et al. (2013:856, figs. 2–3)	K.-T. Kim (2020); Son (2020)	Found on beach around 10 am by local resident Man-soo Jeong. Reported to Dokdo Fisheries Research Center of the National Institute of Fisheries Science. Total weight not measured.
537 (📷)	20 February 2010	Ikarashi, Nishi-ku, Niigata, Niigata Prefecture, Japan {NWP}	Found washed ashore, dead	Architeuthis sp.	Entire?, good condition	Entire?		ML: 1.7 m; WL: 3.4 m; WT: 109.2 kg	National Museum of Nature and Science (Tokyo)	"Senor" (2010); [Anon.] (2010b); [Anon.] (2010c); [Anon.] (2010d)	Local newspapers	Found on beach by dog walker who notified local police station. Identified by Niigata City Aquarium based on fin shape.
538	22 May 2010	Pacific Ocean [south of New Zealand] (51.181667°S 166.435000°E) at 197 m depth {SWP}	Not stated	Architeuthis dux	Not stated		Undetermined (adult)	None given		da Fonseca et al. (2020)		Chromatin and genomic DNA extracted from arm used to generate annotated draft genome of Architeuthis dux.
539 (📷)	4 July 2010	near southern seamount off continental shelf out from Narooma, Australia {SWP}	Found floating at surface	"giant squid"	Parts of head, arms, and tentacles[?]; partially eaten	None; discarded into ocean		TL[AL?]: "close to" 3 m; ?EL: 5 m [estimate]		Gorton (2010)		Found by Narooma fisherman Tony Lawson and his crew while chasing bluefin tuna.
(📷)	7 August 2010 (morning)	Houghton Bay, Wellington, New Zealand {SWP}	Found washed ashore in stormwater channel, dead	"giant squid"	Entire; "in bad shape"	Beak; other remains left to the elements, washed out to sea around 3 pm		?EL: 3.5–4 m [estimate; "small"]	NMNZ	Harvey (2010); [Anon.] (2010h); Pollock (2010)		Probably attacked at sea. Initially identified as a colossal squid by Department of Conservation Wellington area manager, Rob Stone. Correct identification by Te Papa communications manager, Jane Kieg. Te Papa only interested in beak for examination due to poor condition of specimen.
540	2011 (reported)	"Shared Offshore Foraging Area" (SOFA), halfway between North American mainland and Hawaiian Islands {NEP}	Found floating at surface, dead	Architeuthis sp.	Entire, badly mutilated; anterior portion of mantle with damaged head and arm stubs			None given		Denham (2011a); Domeier (2011)		Found by crew of MV Ocean ("Shark Men") while tracking great white sharks. Identification confirmed by giant squid expert Steve O'Shea. Featured in 2011 episode of National Geographic Channel series Expedition Great White (later retitled Shark Men).
541 (📷)	early April 2011	Fosa de Hércules, off Province of A Coruña, Spain, at 600 m depth {NEA}	By trawl	Architeuthis	Entire, missing one tentacle	Entire	Female	EL: 6 m; WT: 48 kg	CEPESMA	[Anon.] (2011b); [Anon.] (2011c)		Caught by the trawler Minchos VI. Reported 11 April 2011; captured week prior. Both this specimen and another caught by Minchos VI the previous year were noted for differing anatomically from other Spanish giant squid specimens. Transferred to CEPESMA in Luarca for planned necropsy.
542 (📷)	26 June 2011 (morning)	12 miles (19 km) off Jensen Beach, Florida, United States, over 170 ft (52 m) deep waters {NWA}	Found floating at surface, dead or "barely alive"	Architeuthis dux	Entire, "extremely well-preserved"; missing one tentacle, patches of red skin intact	Entire	Female	?EL: 23–25 ft (7.0–7.6 m) [or 19 ft (5.8 m)]; ?WL: 11 ft (3.4 m); WT: 200 lb (91 kg)	Florida Museum of Natural History, University of Florida [specimen No. 28 of Roper et al. (2015)]	Crabbe (2011); Mayfield (2011); Than (2011); Torrent (2011); Thomas (2011, 2 figs.); Roper et al. (2015:81)	J.-H. Choi (2011)	May have died shortly after mating. Found by Stuart fishermen Robert Benz, Paul Peroulakis, and Joey Asaro. Transferred to Florida Fish and Wildlife Conservation Commission field laboratory in Tequesta on 27 June 2011, and to University of Florida later that day. Genetic samples taken. Mantle injected with formalin and specimen submerged in 10% formalin as part of two-week preservation process.
543 (📷)	July 2011 (reported 24 August 2011)	around 2 miles (3.2 km) south of Los Gigantes cliff, Tenerife, Canary Islands, over 800–1200 m deep waters {NEA}	Found floating at/just below surface, dead	Architeuthis	Entire, missing tentacles, eyes, ends of arms, patches of red skin intact; "in good general condition"	Beak and sucker samples	Female?	EL: ~8 m [estimate with intact tentacles]	Association for the Study of Cetaceans in the Canary Islands (SECAC)	Corniola (2011); Lamar (2011)	Millán (2019)	Found by Aquawork film crew during filming of documentary on local cetaceans. Floating specimen filmed with diver. Several shearwaters observed in area prior to discovery of carcass.
544 (📷)	13 July 2011	off Jeongja breakwater, southeast coast of Jeongja-dong, Buk-gu, Ulsan, South Korea {NWP}	Caught in fixed net	giant squid	Entire	Not stated		?EL: 7.3 m; WT: 70 kg		S.-H. Lee (2011); J.-H. Choi (2011)		Caught at 8 am by small fishing boat Myeong-Sho (1.42 tons) captained by Dal-Jun Yoon. Sold at Jeongja Market for 150,000 won (equivalent to US$135 in 2025).
545 (📷)	23 August 2011 (reported)	Ocean Beach, entrance to Farewell Spit, New Zealand {SWP}	Found washed ashore	Architeuthis	Entire	None; left to the elements		?EL: "nearly four metres"		Gale (2011)		Found by Paddy Gillooly of Farewell Spit Eco Tours.
546 (📷)	31 March 2012 (afternoon)	Kaikōura Canyon, New Zealand {SWP}	Male sperm whale photographed at surface with severed giant squid arm attached to side of head	"giant squid"	Single arm	None; seen to have detached by following day		None given		Nicoll (2012)		Observed by Whale Watch Kaikōura tour group, including tour guide Sarah Rousseaux. Sperm whale (nicknamed "MatiMati") had been diving for around 45 minutes prior to observation.
547 (📷)	1 June 2012	about 50 km off Jervis Bay, New South Wales, Australia {SWP}	Found floating at surface, dead	Architeuthis	Entire, portions of arms and tentacles missing, orange skin intact, not foul-smelling; likely very fresh	Beak and tissue samples; carcass too heavy to bring aboard		?WL: 3 m [estimate]; WT: >400 lb (180 kg) [estimate]	Australian Museum	Holland (2012); Smith (2012); Thomas (2012); Hill (2012)	Numerous media sources	Found by The Daily Telegraph columnist Al McGlashan during tuna and swordfish fishing expedition, after spotting albatross sitting on carcass. Tied to boat; photographed and filmed over period of 3 hours. Blue shark measuring 2.5 m filmed feeding on remains. Others on board included Justin Lewis, a film crew, and Phil Bolton, fisheries officer with New South Wales Fishing and Aquaculture. Beak went on display as part of Australian Museum's Deep Ocean exhibition, beginning 16 June 2012.
(📷)	3 June 2012	off Nagahama, Kōzu-shima, Izu Islands, Japan {NWP}	Caught in fixed net	Architeuthis dux	Entire; tentacles intact	Entire?	(juvenile)	ML: 279 mm; EL: 1355 mm; TL: 1000 mm; WT: 368.6 g		[Anon.] (c. 2016)		Caught by Kozu Maru. First recorded specimen from northern Izu Islands. Identified by Tsunemi Kubodera.
548 (📷)	1–11 July 2012	off Ogasawara Islands, Japan, at ~700 m depth {NWP}	Filmed alive from remote camera system	Architeuthis	Five recordings of live animals; likely multiple individuals	None		?WL: ~4 m [estimate]		Lyden (2013); Schrope (2013); Millikan (2013); [NHK] (2013b); Schwerin (2013); Widder (2013a); Tucker (2013); Lazzerini (2013); Widder (2013b); Widder (2021:262, 266, 2 pls.)	Dery (2013); DeFede (2019); Robinson et al. (2021:2); Fidler (2021); numerous media sources	First videos of live giant squid in its natural deep-water habitat. Black-and-white footage recorded from "Medusa" system ("e-jelly" lure attached to remote camera with red light source) suspended from floating buoy. First encounter took place on 1 July at 16:48 during second deployment (and first with "e-jelly"; two sequences recorded 4 minutes apart and third more than hour later); first viewed 3 July. Next encounter recorded on third "Medusa" deployment 3 miles (4.8 km) away and 5 days later. This was followed by recording from manned submersible (#549) and then another encounter on fifth "Medusa" deployment on 11 July at 5:46 am (shown out-of-sequence in documentaries), in which squid passed over optical lure and "attacked" camera system in manner consistent with Edith Widder's "alarm hypothesis".
549 (📷)	July 2012 (about one week after first video of #548)	~15 km east of Chichi Island, Ogasawara Islands, Japan, initially at 630 m depth; later followed to ~900 m depth {NWP}	Filmed and photographed alive from submersible	Architeuthis	Entire; missing both tentacles (possibly regenerating)	None		WL: 3 m; EL: 8 m [estimate; if tentacles intact]		Robey (2012); Schur (2013); Ito (2013); Revkin (2013); Mullen (2013); [Anon.] (2013a); Lyden (2013); Schrope (2013); Millikan (2013); Dawkins (2013); Johnston (2013); Frazer (2013); Widder (2013a); Widder (2013b); [NHK] (2013a); [NHK] (2013b); [NHK] (2013c); [NHK] (2013d); Schwerin (2013); Kubodera (2013a); Kubodera (2013b); Sakamoto (2013a); Lazzerini (2013); [NHK] (2014); Widder (2021:264, 1 pl.); Sakamoto (N.d.)	Hellwarth (2012); Dery (2013); Sakamoto (2013b); Tucker (2013); Cronin (2016); Lamb (2018:50); Robinson et al. (2021:2); numerous media sources	Widely reported as first video of live giant squid in natural habitat (but see #548). Observed swimming against current and holding in its arms bait squid (1-metre Thysanoteuthis rhombus with flashing squid jig, attached to submersible with monofilament; mantle cavity stuffed with several blocks of syntactic foam to render only slightly negatively buoyant for slow descent). Filmed from Triton 3300/3 submersible for 23 minutes by three-man crew comprising Tsunemi Kubodera, NHK cameraman Tatsuhiko Sugita, and pilot Jim Harris, initially under low-light and then for 18 minutes under submersible's bright main lights, which apparently did not disturb the feeding squid. Expedition was joint effort by NHK, Discovery Channel, and Japan's National Museum of Nature and Science; scientific team was led by Kubodera, Steve O'Shea, and Edith Widder. Footage officially announced on 10 December 2012, by Robey (2012).
550 (📷)	10 October 2012 (afternoon)	Playa de Getares, Punta Carnero, Algeciras, Andalusia, Spain {MED}	Found washed ashore	Architeuthis dux	Entire	Entire	Female (immature)	EL: 6.45/7.5 m; ?WL: 3.6 m; WT: 70 kg	El Estrecho Natural Park	[Anon.] (2012a); [Anon.] (2012b); [Anon.] (2013b); [Anon.] (2013c); [Anon.] (2013d); Muñoz (2013); Prieto (2013); [Anon.] (2013i)	Numerous media sources	Largest known specimen from Mediterranean and fourth overall. Found by volunteers who moved it to Cala Arenas, then handed over to CEGMA who transferred it to Algeciras for freezing. Dissected in front of TV cameras on 1 February 2013 by staff from CEPESMA, CSIC, and CEGMA, including Ángel Guerra and Luis Laria. Internal organs examined and tissues sampled for heavy metals and genetic analysis. Specimen found to be extremely thin, with changes in digestive gland and hematopoietic organs. Placed in methacrylate container, first in preservative fluid for 1.5–2 months, then formalin. On public display at El Estrecho Natural Park information point from 22 May through October 2013.
551 (📷)	3 February 2013 (morning)	off Shark's Tooth point, South Bay, Kaikōura, New Zealand {SWP}	Found floating at surface, dead but fresh	"giant squid"	Entire, posterior end of mantle missing (otherwise in "perfect" condition)	Entire	Female	EL: ~8 m [estimated ~11 m if complete]; TL: ~6.5 m; WT: >140/150 kg [estimate?]	Kaikoura Marine Centre and Aquarium / NMNZ (one tentacle)	[Anon.] (2013e); Dangerfield (2013a); Dangerfield (2013b); Williams (2013)	Hill (2015); numerous media sources	On public display. Found by Christchurch recreational fishermen Jack and Sharon Osikai around 8 am while returning from fishing trip; towed ashore behind boat. Marine biologist Megan Bosch of Kaikoura Marine Centre and Aquarium speculated bite marks on mantle might have resulted from attack by larger squid. Bosch dissected specimen live on TV3's Campbell Live on 4 February 2013. Stomach contents found to be "well-digested". Specimen on display at aquarium from March 2013 in five custom-made glass containers each holding different parts.
552 (📷)	19 April 2013 (early morning)	Uchinoura Bay, off Uchinoura, Kimotsuki District, Kagoshima Prefecture, Kyushu Island, Japan (31°17′N 131°08′E) at 45 m depth {NWP}	Caught in fixed net, alive	Architeuthis dux	Entire	Entire	Unclear (young)	EL: 608.5 mm; ML: 140.8 mm; VML: 131.0 mm; MW: 29.4 mm [maximum]; HL: 34.7 mm; HW: 32.2 mm; FL: 56.2 mm; FW: 40.5 mm; EyD: 18.2 mm; LRL: 2.2 mm; URL: 2.0 mm; FuCL: 10.2/8.7 mm [left/right]; FuCW: 2.9/2.7 mm [left/right]; WT: 44.8 g; extensive additional measurements	Kagoshima City Aquarium "Io World"	Wada et al. (2015:3, fig. 2); Jozuka (2015); Yuhas (2015)	Shimada et al. (2017:9); numerous media sources	Caught by Shioji Maru. Species identification confirmed by COI sequence analysis. Exhibited at Kagoshima City Aquarium "Io World" between 20 November 2015 and 31 January 2016, preserved in ethanol.
553 (📷)	28 April 2013	near Cape Campbell Lighthouse, Marlborough, New Zealand {SWP}	Found washed ashore	Architeuthis dux	Entire, missing tentacles and arm tips, bite damage (otherwise in good condition; eye(s) and red skin intact)	None; left to decompose on beach		WL: 1.5 m; AL: ~0.5 m		Kirk (2013); [Anon.] (2013f)		Found by Marlborough resident Jason Gluer while quad biking. Inspected by ranger and photographs sent to Te Papa for research purposes. Measurements provided by Department of Conservation spokesperson Clare Duston.
554 (📷)	30 May 2013	off Brazil (25°36′S 042°21′W; see map) {SWA}	Found floating at surface, dead	Architeuthis dux	Entire; "looked relatively well preserved, but had begun to deteriorate due to wave action"	None; not collected		"length": ~2 m [estimate]		Leite et al. (2016)		Sighted by three Marine Mammal Observers (Luciana Leite, Daniel Campbell & Leonardo Versiani) on duty on board an operating seismic vessel. As the specimen was not examined its death cannot be unequivocally attributed to the seismic activity. Species identified by teuthologist Ángel Guerra from photograph by Leite. A "similar, smaller squid" was seen by Versiani in the same area earlier that month, but no photos were taken.
555 (📷)	14 June 2013	off Hamada, Shimane Prefecture, Japan (34°56′N 131°59′E) at 120–130 m depth {NWP}	Caught in purse seine net	Architeuthis dux	Entire	Entire	Unclear (young)	EL: 1629.0 mm; ML: 332.0 mm; MW: 88.5 mm [maximum]; HL: 47.0 mm; HW: 43.1 mm; FL: 100.1 mm; FW: 63.1 mm; EyD: 36.3 mm; LRL: 4.0 mm; URL: 4.2 mm; FuCL: 30.1/28.3 mm [left/right]; FuCW: 6.7/6.7 mm [left/right]; WT: 390.6 g; extensive additional measurements	Shimane Prefectural Fisheries Technology Center	Wada et al. (2015:3, figs. 3–6); Jozuka (2015); Yuhas (2015)	Shimada et al. (2017:9); numerous media sources	Caught by Yoshikatsu Maru in same purse seine net as 1487 mm EL specimen; one of the two was exhibited at the Shimane Prefectural Fisheries Technology Center from 18 March 2015, preserved in ethanol. Species identification confirmed by COI sequence analysis.
556 (📷)	14 June 2013	off Hamada, Shimane Prefecture, Japan (34°56′N 131°59′E) at 120–130 m depth {NWP}	Caught in purse seine net	Architeuthis dux	Entire	Entire	Unclear (young)	EL: 1487.0 mm; ML: 332.0 mm; MW: 58.5 mm [maximum]; HL: 33.0 mm; HW: 38.5 mm; FL: 111.9 mm; FW: 67.3 mm; EyD: 36.2 mm; LRL: 4.2 mm; URL: 4.1 mm; FuCL: 27.0/26.5 mm [left/right]; FuCW: 6.4/6.7 mm [left/right]; WT: 357.0 g; extensive additional measurements	Shimane Prefectural Fisheries Technology Center	Wada et al. (2015:3, figs. 3–6); Jozuka (2015); Yuhas (2015)	Shimada et al. (2017:9); numerous media sources	Caught by Yoshikatsu Maru in same purse seine net as 1629 mm EL specimen; one of the two was exhibited at the Shimane Prefectural Fisheries Technology Center from 18 March 2015, preserved in ethanol. Species identification confirmed by COI sequence analysis.
557 (📷)	2013	McDougalls Bay, South Africa {SEA}	Found washed ashore, photographed alive	Architeuthis	Entire; eye(s) and skin largely intact, tentacles missing			None given		Scheepers (2017)	Kemper (2017:2)	Photographed on beach while alive ("still breathing").
558 (📷)	18 July 2013	500 m off Sesimbra, Portugal, at 15 m depth {NEA}	Caught in net	giant squid	Entire; tentacles intact	None?		EL: 6.5 m; WT: 50 kg		Carvalho & Pacheco (2013); [Anon.] (2013j); [Anon.] (2013k)		Caught in net of boat Mano Chum by Armindo Silva (though widely reported as Eduardo Pinto) with help of second fisherman, while fishing for "pescadas" and "sargos" beginning at 4 am. Net torn during capture; second net required from colleague. Head cut off to fit into 5 m boat. Landed at Sesimbra harbour where displayed until late morning. After no offers to buy specimen and auction sale at 1 euro per kilo or around €50 total (equivalent to US$66 in 2025), cut into pieces and given to friends; remaining 12 kg to be consumed following day, possibly stewed with beans or fried. Marine biologist Emanuel Gonçalves interviewed about find.
559 (📷)	16 August 2013 (afternoon)	~0.5 miles (0.80 km) off Merón beach, Villaviciosa, Asturias, Spain {NEA}	Found floating at surface, dead	Architeuthis dux	Entire, fresh; with multiple bite marks, missing ends of arms and tentacles, eyes intact	Entire	Female	WT: >70/80 kg; EL: 8 m [estimate]	CEPESMA	Ramos (2013); [Anon.] (2013l); [Anon.] (2013m); [Anon.] (2013n); [Anon.] (2013o); Salas (2013)	Romar (2016)	Likely carried from Carrandi Trench by strong northeast winds. Found by Gijón fishermen Caesar Ceñal and Pachi Sánchez. Brought to Gijón port and there examined by Luis Laria. Transferred by CEPESMA to Museo del Calamar Gigante in Luarca and frozen for necropsy. Necropsied by Ángel Villa and Roger Villanueva of CSIC on 29 September 2013 with male specimen from Palombina. Cause of death determined to be asphyxiation by larger female of possibly more than twice its weight, according to Luis Laria (first record involving such aggressive intraspecific behaviour; see #648 for second).
	mid-September 2013 [recovered just over 10 days prior to 1 October]	Palombina beach, Llanes, Asturias, Spain {NEA}	Not stated	Architeuthis	Entire; poor condition	Entire	Male	WT: 55 kg	CEPESMA	Salas (2013); [Anon.] (2013o); del Castillo (2013)		Necropsied on 29 September 2013 with female specimen from Merón.
560 (📷)	1 October 2013 (morning)	by mouth of Deva River, La Arena beach, near Pechón, Val de San Vicente, Cantabria, Spain {NEA}	Found washed ashore	Architeuthis dux	Entire, missing skin and part of one tentacle, eyes present though burst; good condition with no external signs of bites or attacks	Entire	Female (adult)	EL: 8.08 m; ML: 1.68 m; HL: 40 cm; AL: 2.3 m; TL: 6 m; WT: 150 kg	Maritime Museum of Cantabria	del Castillo (2013); Chato (2013); San José (2013); [Anon.] (2013p); [Anon.] (2013q); [Anon.] (2013r); Thomas (2013); Bryner (2013)	Bolívar (2015); numerous media sources	Found and documented by underwater photographer Enrique Talledo. Moved to Maritime Museum of Cantabria in Santander where specimen was cleaned, sampled for analysis, and placed in cold storage (initial cold shock at −20 °C followed by −18 °C) under direction of Gerardo García-Castrillo. On morning of 2 October specimen was injected with alcohol, covered with paper moistened with 10% formalin, and finally covered with transparent film; may eventually be put on display. Entire length initially reported as >10 m and weight as 170, 174, or 180 kg.
561	19 October 2013 (morning)	Grosse Bucht, near Lüderitz, ǃNamiǂNûs, Namibia {SEA}	Found washed ashore	Architeuthis	Entire, in "decomposed state"; most limbs missing			ML: 1.35 m; ?EL: 4–5 m [estimate]; AC: 18 cm ["tentacles"]		Ngulu (2013)	Kemper (2017:2)	Found by someone on 19 October, then again the next day by Walvis Bay resident Johan van den Westhuizen, who provided measurements. Marine scientist Jean-Paul Roux from the Ministry of Fisheries and Marine Resources said "inspectors could not verify the species due its decomposed state".
562 (📷)	28 December 2013 (reported; caught prior night)	off Busan, South Korea {NWP}	Caught in fishing net	giant squid	Entire	Not stated		?WL: >4.5 m; WT: 100 kg		M.-S. Park (2013); [Anon.] (2013s)		Displayed at Jagalchi Fish Market where auctioned off for 300,000 won (equivalent to US$274 in 2025; a low price per kilogram).
563	4 January 2014	off Himi-shi, Toyama Prefecture, Japan (36.54°N 137.04°E) at <100 m depth {NWP}	Caught in fixed net for Japanese amberjack, dead	Architeuthis dux	Entire; tentacles missing			WL: 350 cm	[specimen A-1 of Kubodera et al. (2016)]	Yoshikawa (2014); Saul (2014); Kubodera et al. (2016, 1 fig. in supplementary material)	Fuji News Network report, 4 January 2014; [Anon.] (2014i); [Anon.] (2014o); Sakamoto (2014)	Found by fisherman; landed at Himi fishing port. Covered by TBS News.
564 (📷)	8 January 2014 (morning)	1 km off Shirose, Sado Island, Niigata Prefecture, Japan (38.07°N 138.27°E) at 70 m depth {NWP}	Found in stationary net; filmed alive at surface; died during retrieval	Architeuthis dux	Entire	Entire; missing tentacles and most of red skin	Female [reported as male by other sources]	DML: 187 cm; WL: 406/411.4 cm; EL: ~8 m [estimate]; WT: 163 kg	Fisheries Ocean Research Institute, Niigata Prefecture [specimen A-2 of Kubodera et al. (2016)]	Yamamoto (2014); Thomas (2014); [Anon.] (2014a); Hofilena (2014); Krishnan (2014); Saijo (2014); Yoshikawa (2014); Saul (2014); [Anon.] (2015a); Higuchi et al. (2016); Kubodera et al. (2016, 1 fig. in supplementary material)	Sakamoto (2014); numerous media sources	Caught by fisherman Shigenori Goto, who also caught specimen on 10 February 2014. Found in net for Japanese amberjacks (Seriola quinqueradiata) at 70 m depth at around 7 am local time; video footage recorded. Animal died shortly after being brought to surface. Reported by M. Higuchi of the Niigata Prefectural Fisheries and Marine Research Institute (where specimen was studied), who photographed it in Sado Ryotsu fishing port (see video). Delivered frozen to Sapporo Maruyama Zoo in Hokkaido, where thawed, spread out for display and frozen again; briefly exhibited there in frozen state in the open air from 1 January 2015 (freezing temperatures at the time kept it "fresh"). Visitors were invited to touch it but warned of its strong smell.
565	19 January 2014	Arahama Beach, Kashiwazaki-shi, Niigata Prefecture, Japan (37.24°N 138.34°E) {NWP}	Found stranded on beach, dead	Architeuthis dux	Head and arms only; tentacles missing			AL: 1.2 m	[specimen A-3 of Kubodera et al. (2016)]	Yoshikawa (2014); Kubodera et al. (2016)	Sakamoto (2014)	Found by local people. Reported by K. Minowa of Kashiwazaki City Museum.
566 (📷)	20 January 2014 [or 21 January]	30 km off Aoya-cho, Tottori-shi, Tottori Prefecture, Japan (35.52°N 134.11°E) at 236 m depth {NWP}	Caught in bottom gillnets for flounder, alive	Architeuthis dux	Entire; tentacles missing	Entire	Female (mature)	DML: 148/170 cm; WL: 3.2 m/340 cm; EL: ~8 m [estimate]	San'in Kaigan Geopark Museum of the Earth and Sea [specimen A-4 of Kubodera et al. (2016)]	Yoshikawa (2014); Saul (2014); Kubodera et al. (2016); Ichisawa et al. (2018:10, 11, 15, fig. 4a)	Sakamoto (2014); Shimada et al. (2017:9)	On public display. Found by fisherman and reported by T. Wada. Landed at Ajiro port, Iwami. Initially stored frozen. Exhibited at San'in Kaigan Geopark Museum of the Earth and Sea from 2 February 2016, preserved in formalin; displayed next to gladius of #643.
567	10 February 2014 [or 11 February]	2 km off Shirose, Sado Island, Niigata Prefecture, Japan (38.08°N 138.30°E) at <274 m depth {NWP}	Caught in bottom gillnets for anglerfish, alive	Architeuthis dux	Entire; tentacles missing		Male	DML: 136 cm; WL: 305 cm; WT: ~100 kg	[specimen A-5 of Kubodera et al. (2016)]	Yoshikawa (2014); Higuchi et al. (2016); Kubodera et al. (2016, 1 fig. in supplementary material)	Sakamoto (2014)	Caught by fisherman Shigenori Goto, who also caught specimen on 8 January 2014. Reported by M. Higuchi of the Niigata Prefectural Fisheries and Marine Research Institute, who photographed and dissected it with his co-worker at Sado Ryotsu fishing port.
568	13 February 2014	off Washizaki, Sado Island, Niigata Prefecture, Japan (38.19°N 138.33°E) at <159 m depth {NWP}	Caught in fixed net, alive	Architeuthis dux	Entire; tentacles intact		Male	DML: 91 cm; EL: 394 cm; WT: 25.2 kg	[specimen A-6 of Kubodera et al. (2016)]	Kubodera et al. (2016, 1 fig. in supplementary material)	Sakamoto (2014)	Reported by S. Abe of the Niigata Prefectural Fisheries and Marine Research Institute, who photographed it in Sado Washizaki fishing port.
569 (📷)	25 February 2014 (morning)	~5 km from Moroyose fishing port, Shinonsen, Hyogo Prefecture, Japan (35.38°N 134.25°E) {NWP}	Photographed alive at surface; snared with rope; died during retrieval	Architeuthis dux	Entire; tentacles missing	Not stated	Female	WL: 410 cm/4.13 m; EL: 8–9 m [estimate]; WT: 150–200/~200 kg	[specimen A-7 of Kubodera et al. (2016)]	[Anon.] (2014f); Kubodera et al. (2016)	Sakamoto (2014)	Spotted by fisherman Tetsuo Okamoto while diving for turban shells at around 10:30 am local time. Squid swam above Okamoto when he was at depth of ~8 m. Squid was secured to boat with a rope and taken to Moroyose port; video footage of live animal recorded. Reported by T. Yamaguchi of NHK.
570	2 March 2014	on the shore of Shiidomari, Sado Island, Niigata Prefecture, Japan (38.08°N 138.29°E) {NWP}	Found stranded on beach, dead	Architeuthis dux	Entire; tentacles missing		Female	DML: 135 cm; WL: 285 cm	[specimen A-8 of Kubodera et al. (2016)]	Kubodera et al. (2016, 1 fig. in supplementary material)	Sakamoto (2014)	Reported by S. Abe of the Niigata Prefectural Fisheries and Marine Research Institute, who photographed it as found.
571	4 March 2014	on the rocky shore of Akasaki, Kotoura-cho, Tottori Prefecture, Japan (35.31°N 133.37°E) {NWP}	Found stranded on beach, dead	Architeuthis dux	Entire, poor condition; several arms torn off, one tentacle intact			DML: 120.8 cm; EL: 462.5 cm	[specimen A-9 of Kubodera et al. (2016)]	Kubodera et al. (2016); Ichisawa et al. (2018:10, 11, 15, fig. 4b)		Mantle cut open by locals. Reported by T. Wada.
572 (📷)	5 March 2014	off Amarube, Kasumi-ku, Kami-cho, Hyogo Prefecture, Japan (30.53°N 134.34°E) at <223 m depth {NWP}	By bottom trawl for firefly squid, dead	Architeuthis dux	Entire; tentacles intact			DML: 123 cm; EL: 430 cm; WT: 50 kg	[specimen A-10 of Kubodera et al. (2016)]	[Kinosaki] (2014); Kubodera et al. (2016)		On public display. Found by local fisherman and reported by T. Wada. Long arms folded for storage in freezer. Displayed at Kinosaki Marine World from 10 March 2014 as part of Backyard Tour, during which visitors could touch specimen.
573 (📷)	12 March 2014	Tokyo Bay, ~50 m offshore, off Yokosuka, Kanagawa Prefecture, Japan {NWP}	Found floating at surface; housed in tank where photographed alive; transported by truck but "died several hours after being caught"	Architeuthis	Entire	Entire, including internal organs; tentacles intact, red skin partly intact	Female (immature)	ML: 91 cm; EL: 4.38 m [initially reported as 3.6 m]; WT: 24.28 kg; extensive additional measurements	Kannonzaki Nature Museum	[Anon.] (2014g); [Anon.] (2014u); [Anon.] (2014v); [Anon.] (2014w); [Anon.] (2014x); [Keikyu] (2014a); [Keikyu] (2014b); [Anon.] (2021a); [Anon.] (2021b)	[Anon.] (2015b); Shimada et al. (2017:9)	On public display. Caught by local fisherman affiliated with Kanagawa Eastern Fisheries Cooperative Association. Public dissection carried out by Tsunemi Kubodera, Toshiaki Kuramochi and Akiko Yatabe at Keikyu Aburatsubo Marine Park, Miura, on 8 August 2014 (covered by TV Tokyo). Dissection took 2 hours and involved removal of internal organs, sex determination, and measurements. Small fish bones found in stomach and scales (likely from sardine) in buccal area. Specimen estimated to be 1–2 years old. Displayed at Keikyu Aburatsubo Marine Park (as was #632) in acrylic tank (2 m × 1 m × 55 cm), preserved in formalin, from 13 September 2014. Marine park closed in late September 2021; both specimens transferred to Kannonzaki Nature Museum under curatorial director Kazuhiko Yamada (formerly a keeper at Keikyu Aburatsubo), where displayed from 9 November.
574 (📷)	16 March 2014	Benten-hama, Itoigawa-shi, Niigata Prefecture, Japan (37.04°N 137.56°E) {NWP}	Found stranded on beach, dead	Architeuthis dux	Entire; tentacles missing	Entire	Female (mature)	DML: 196 cm; WL: 446 cm; WT: ~200 kg [as initially reported; measurements after thawing: ML: 165 cm; WL: 394 cm; AL: 187 cm; WT: 174 kg]	National Museum of Nature and Science facility (Tsukuba) [specimen A-11 of Kubodera et al. (2016)]	Kubodera et al. (2016, 1 fig. in supplementary material); McKirdy (2018, 4 figs.); McKirdy & Johnson (2018)	Sakamoto (2014)	Reported and photographed as found by M. Baba of Joetsu Aquarium Museum. Frozen on day of discovery and transferred to National Museum of Nature and Science facility in Tsukuba; thawed in September 2018 and dissected day later by Tsunemi Kubodera and team of 15 researchers from various medical fields assembled by Mitsunaga Narushima, head of Department of Plastic and Reconstructive Surgery at Mie University. Internal organs removed; focus areas for researchers included nervous system, eyes, and blood. Ovaries and fallopian tubes found to be greatly enlarged; likely to have spawned in 2014 if had survived. Dissection organised by filmmaker Shinichi Motoki for his documentary about Kubodera's work on giant squid; planned for April–May 2019 release.
575 (📷)	24 March 2014	30 km off Mishima, Hagi-shi, Yamaguchi Prefecture, Japan (35.08°N 131.10°E) at <121 m depth {NWP}	By bottom trawl	Architeuthis dux	Entire; tentacles intact	Entire	Male	DML: 116 cm; WL: 270 cm; EL: 5.71 m	Shimane AQUAS Aquarium [specimen A-12 of Kubodera et al. (2016)]	Kubodera et al. (2016)	Sakamoto (2014); Shimada et al. (2017:9)	On public display. Found by fisherman and reported by T. Fujita of Shimane AQUAS Aquarium, where specimen has been on display since 18 March 2015, preserved in formalin.
576	26 March 2014 (early morning)	200 m off Hayoshi Port, Sado Island, Niigata Prefecture, Japan (38.07°N 138.26°E) at ~20 m depth [or <206 m] {NWP}	Caught in fixed net, alive	Architeuthis dux	Entire; tentacles intact, red skin missing	Entire	Female	DML: 84 cm; EL: 448 cm; WT: 33.2 kg	National Museum of Nature and Science facility (Tsukuba) [specimen A-13 of Kubodera et al. (2016)]	Kakuno (2014); Higuchi et al. (2016); Kubodera et al. (2016)	Sakamoto (2014)	Caught by local fisherman Yuji Kawaguchi. Reported by M. Higuchi of the Niigata Prefectural Fisheries and Marine Research Institute.
577 (📷)	26 March 2014	off Ryotsu Port, Sado Island, Niigata Prefecture, Japan (38.04°N 138.26°E) {NWP}	Found floating at surface, alive	Architeuthis dux	Entire; tentacles, eye(s) and red skin intact	Entire	Male	DML: 110 cm; EL: 435 cm; WT: 37.7 kg	National Museum of Nature and Science facility (Tsukuba) [specimen A-14 of Kubodera et al. (2016)]	Kakuno (2014); Higuchi et al. (2016); Kubodera et al. (2016, 1 fig. in supplementary material)	Sakamoto (2014)	Caught later the same day as Hayoshi Port specimen, by different local fisherman. Reported by M. Higuchi of the Niigata Prefectural Fisheries and Marine Research Institute, who photographed it in Sado Ryotsu fishing port.
578 (📷)	2 April 2014	Sadong Port, Giseong-myeon, Uljin-gun, North Gyeongsang Province, South Korea {NWP}	Caught in fixed net	giant squid	Entire	Not stated		BL: 1 m; ?WL: 3 m; ?AL: 2 m		[Anon.] (2014h)		Caught around 3:30 am by 15-ton fishing vessel. Sold by traders in Pohang for undisclosed sum. Reported by Pohang Coast Guard.
579	7 April 2014	Toyama Bay, 1 km off Yokataminatomachi, Toyama-shi, Toyama Prefecture, Japan (36.46°N 137.15°E) at <100 m depth {NWP}	Caught in fixed net for firefly squid, alive	Architeuthis dux	Entire; missing ends of tentacle(s)	Not stated	Male	DML: ~1.5 m; WL: ~3.5 m; EL: 7 m [estimate]	[specimen A-15 of Kubodera et al. (2016)]	[Anon.] (2014i); Kubodera et al. (2016)	The Sankei Shimbun, 7 April 2014; [Anon.] (2014j); [Anon.] (2014n); [Anon.] (2014o); Sakamoto (2014)	Alive at time of capture, dead when landed. Found by fisherman; examined and measured by expert(s) from Uozu Aquarium.
580 (📷)	8 April 2014 (morning)	Toyama Bay, 1.5 km off Shinminato, Imizu-shi, Toyama Prefecture, Japan (36.48°N 137.07°E) at <300 m depth {NWP}	By bottom trawl; briefly kept alive in tank where photographed	Architeuthis dux	Entire; tentacles intact	Not stated		DML: 110 cm; WL: 275 cm; EL: 510 m	[specimen A-16 of Kubodera et al. (2016)]	[Anon.] (2014j); [Anon.] (2014k); Kubodera et al. (2016)	The Sankei Shimbun, 8 April 2014; [Anon.] (2014n); [Anon.] (2014o); Sakamoto (2014)	Second specimen from Toyama Bay in two days. Caught in net for Japanese glass shrimp or Metapenaeopsis lata (broad velvet shrimp). Landed at Shinminato fishing port. Survived in tank for two hours after landing. Tasted by Kazuhisa Hagiwara of Shinminato Fisheries Cooperative Association who described it as very salty. Osamu Inamura, director of Uozu Aquarium, suggested global warming might be responsible for influx of specimens as giant squid's range is pushed northward.
581	9 April 2014	west of Nekozaki Peninsula, Toyooka-shi, Hyogo Prefecture, Japan (35.40°N 134.45°E) {NWP}	Found floating at surface, dead	Architeuthis dux	Entire; tentacles intact			DML: 112 cm; EL: 594 cm	Kinosaki Marine World [specimen A-17 of Kubodera et al. (2016)]	Kubodera et al. (2016)		Found by angler and reported by T. Wada.
582 (📷)	12 April 2014 (morning)	off Aika-cho, Matsue-shi, Shimane Prefecture, Japan (35.30°N 132.54°E) {NWP}	Found floating at water's edge, alive	Architeuthis dux	Entire	Not stated		EL: ~5 m	[specimen A-18 of Kubodera et al. (2016)]	[Anon.] (2014l); Kubodera et al. (2016)	The Shikoku Shimbun, 12 April 2014; Sakamoto (2014)	Found by Etsuo Harada and others at 9 am. Pulled to land and died soon afterwards.
583	12 April 2014	off Waki, Sado Island, Niigata Prefecture, Japan (38.09°N 138.29°E) at <200 m depth {NWP}	Caught in fixed net	Architeuthis dux	Entire?			DML: ~100 cm	[specimen A-19 of Kubodera et al. (2016)]	Kubodera et al. (2016)		Reported by M. Higuchi of the Niigata Prefectural Fisheries and Marine Research Institute.
584	13 April 2014	at the mouth of Yoshida river, Makidani, Iwami-cho, Tottori Prefecture, Japan (35.35°N 134.2°E) {NWP}	Found stranded on beach, dead	Architeuthis dux	Entire; tentacles intact		Female	DML: 121.5 cm; EL: 637 cm	[specimen A-20 of Kubodera et al. (2016)]	Kubodera et al. (2016); Ichisawa et al. (2018:10, 11, 15, fig. 4c)		Freshly dead specimen. Reported by T. Wada.
585 (📷)	18 April 2014 (morning)	2/3 km off Ohtomari-machi, Nanao-shi, Noto Peninsula, Ishikawa Prefecture, Japan (36.58°N 137.05°E) at <94 m depth {NWP}	Caught in fixed net for Japanese amberjack, dead	Architeuthis dux	Entire; tentacles intact	Beak only?		ML: 0.78 m; EL: 4.7/4.8 m; WT: ~30/50 kg	Notojima Aquarium [specimen A-21 of Kubodera et al. (2016)]	[Anon.] (2014m); [Anon.] (2014n); [Anon.] (2014o); Shinya (2014); Kubodera et al. (2016)	The Hokkoku Shimbun, 19 April 2014; [Anon.] (2014r); [Anon.] (2014s); [Anon.] (2014t); Sakamoto (2014)	Became entangled in fixed net around 5:30 am. Landed at 7:20 am at Nanao City Local Public Wholesale Market as apparently first giant squid in its 28-year history. Bought by supermarket operator Yamanari Shoji Co. and taken in Styrofoam box to Dontaku Southwest Store in Shinbohon, Kanazawa, where displayed on ice between 18 and 19 April. Identification confirmed by Shinichiro Ikeguchi, assistant director of Notojima Aquarium, based on size and fin shape; extracted beak to be displayed there.
586 (📷)	20 April 2014	~130 km off Kitadaito, [Daitō Islands], Okinawa Prefecture, Japan, at 500 m depth {NWP}	Caught	giant squid	Entire, fresh; missing ends of tentacles and some arms	Entire		WL: ~2.7 m; WT: ~32 kg	Okinawa Churaumi Aquarium?	[Anon.] (2014p)		Caught by fishermen targeting Thysanoteuthis rhombus. Transferred to Okinawa Churashima Foundation in Motobu, where specimen was examined beginning on 25 April. Photographed being measured, later fixed in formalin.
587 (📷)	27 April 2014 (morning)	~1 km off Furai port, Saikai, Shika-machi, Ishikawa Prefecture, Japan (37.07°N 136.39°E) at <57 m depth {NWP}	Caught in fixed net; briefly kept alive in tank where photographed	Architeuthis dux	Entire, good condition; eyes, tentacles and some red skin intact	Entire	Female [reported as male by other sources]	DML: 111 cm; WL: 289 cm; EL: 5.02 m/565 cm; WT: ~60 kg	Notojima Aquarium [specimen A-22 of Kubodera et al. (2016)]	[Anon.] (2014q); [Anon.] (2014r); [Anon.] (2014s); [Anon.] (2014t); Kubodera et al. (2016)	Sakamoto (2014)	Caught around 4:30 am by fishermen including deputy helmsman Isamu Mukai and landed in Togi fishing port. Still alive, specimen was transported in container to Notojima Aquarium in Nanao, but died 3 hours after capture. During transport, specimen was observed opening and closing its eyes and hyponome and clinging to container with its suckers; video footage of live animal recorded. Measured at aquarium and displayed there between 3 and 5 May (Golden Week); also dissected there. Reported by S. Ikeguchi of Notojima Aquarium.
588	6 May 2014	north off Kyotango-cho, Kyotango-shi, Kyoto Prefecture, Japan (35.52°N 135.05°E) at <218 m depth {NWP}	By bottom trawl, dead	Architeuthis dux	Entire?	None; discarded		DML: ~100 cm	None [specimen A-23 of Kubodera et al. (2016)]	Kubodera et al. (2016)	Sakamoto (2014)	Found by fisherman and reported by Y. Ueno of the Fisheries Technology Department, Kyoto Prefectural Agriculture, Forestry and Fisheries Technology Center.
589	7 May 2014	off Awashima Island, Awashimaura-mura, Niigata Prefecture, Japan (38.26°N 139.17°E) at <79 m depth {NWP}	By bottom trawl	Architeuthis dux	Entire; tentacles intact			DML: 92 cm; EL: 420 cm	[specimen A-24 of Kubodera et al. (2016)]	Kubodera et al. (2016)	Nigataken Suikaiken Dayori (No. 30)	
(📷)	23 August 2014	Kommetjie, South Africa (34.12682°S 18.33938°E) {SEA}	Found washed ashore, dead	Architeuthis dux	Entire; eye(s) intact, reddish skin largely missing			?WL: ~2.5 m		Robertson (2014)		Found on beach where photographed.
590 (📷)	4 September 2014	off Hamada-shi, Shimane Prefecture, Japan (35.02°N 131.39°E) at 120 m depth {NWP}	Caught in fixed net?	Architeuthis dux	Entire; tentacles missing	Entire	Male	DML: 140 cm; WL: 314 cm	Shimane AQUAS Aquarium [specimen B-1 of Kubodera et al. (2016)]	Kubodera et al. (2016)	Isobe (2019)	Reported by T. Fujita of Shimane AQUAS Aquarium, where specimen was exhibited.
591 (📷)	7 September 2014	~100 miles (160 km) off Matagorda coast, Texas, United States (Gulf of Mexico) {NWA}	Found floating at surface, dead	"giant squid"	Entire; missing red skin and posterior end of mantle (bite marks)	Not stated		?EL: 10 ft (3.0 m); WT: 200 lb (91 kg)	"donated to researchers"	Azad (2014); Alexander (2014)	KTRK-TV report	Found by fisherman Michael Belvin when returning from fishing trip with friends. Identification confirmed by Houston Zoo aquarium supervisor Mike Concannon. Belvin speculated it might have been attacked by a mako shark, based on bite marks.
592 (📷)	22 October 2014	900 m off Komeno, Echizen, Fukui Prefecture, Japan (35.53°N 135.58°E) at 65 m depth {NWP}	Caught in fixed net, dead	Architeuthis dux	Entire; tentacles largely missing		Male	DML: 117 cm; WL: 264 cm; EL: 288 cm [incomplete]; WT: ~40 kg	[specimen B-2 of Kubodera et al. (2016)]	Kubodera et al. (2016, 1 fig. in supplementary material); [Echizen] (N.d.)		Reported and photographed by Seiji Sasai of Echizen Matsushima Aquarium, where specimen was exhibited on ice for four days; planned to be preserved as wet specimen.
593 (📷)	3 November 2014	off Yangpo Port, Pohang, North Gyeongsang Province, South Korea {NWP}	Caught in gill net	giant squid	Entire; tentacles largely intact	Not stated		EL: 5 m; WT: 70 kg		Moon (2014)		Caught around 4 am by 5-ton fishing vessel from Yangpo.
594 (📷)	8 November 2014	1 km off Waki, Sado Island, Niigata Prefecture, Japan (38.09°N 138.29°E) at <200 m depth {NWP}	Caught in fixed net	Architeuthis dux	Entire; tentacle(s) present			EL: 260 cm; WT: ~25 kg	[specimen B-3 of Kubodera et al. (2016)]	[Anon.] (2014y); Kubodera et al. (2016); Higuchi et al. (2016)	The Asahi Shimbun, 11 November 2014	Displayed at Sado Fish Festival in Ryotsu Port, Sado, on 9 November.
595	20 November 2014	east of Okinoshima, Tottori Prefecture, Japan (36.16°N 133.4°E) {NWP}	Caught in purse seine, dead	Architeuthis dux	Entire; tentacles missing, head and mantle separated		Female	DML: 183.5 cm; WT: 130 kg	[specimen B-4 of Kubodera et al. (2016)]	Kubodera et al. (2016)		Reported by K. Ichisawa of Tottori Prefectural Museum. Landed at Sakai port.
596 (📷)	24 November 2014	off Tsunegami Peninsula, around Ongami-jima, Wakasa-cho, Fukui Prefecture, Japan (35.38°N 135.47°E) at <60 m depth {NWP}	Caught in fixed net?, alive	Architeuthis dux	Entire, good condition; tentacle(s) and eye(s) intact	Entire	Male	DML: 134/137 cm; EL: 730/740 cm; WT: ~60 kg	Echizen Matsushima Aquarium [specimen B-5 of Kubodera et al. (2016)]	Kubodera et al. (2016, 1 fig. in supplementary material); [Echizen] (N.d.)	The Chunichi Shimbun, 24 November 2014; Shimada et al. (2017:9)	On public display. Examined at Echizen Matsushima Aquarium and exhibited there from 27 March 2015, preserved in formalin. Photographed laid out on tarpaulin by Seiji Sasai.
597	24 November 2014	1 km off Tangocho-taiza, Kyotango-shi, Kyoto Prefecture, Japan (35.45°N 135.04°E) {NWP}	Found floating at surface, dead	Architeuthis dux	Head and arms only; tentacles missing	None		AL: 1.2 m	[specimen B-6 of Kubodera et al. (2016)]	Kubodera et al. (2016, 1 fig. in supplementary material)		Discovered by an angler and reported by Y. Ueno of the Fisheries Technology Department, Kyoto Prefectural Agriculture, Forestry and Fisheries Technology Center, who photographed it in the water. Specimen left undisturbed.
598 (📷)	27 November 2014	3.3 km off Yahatacho, Imizu-shi, Toyama Prefecture, Japan (36.49°N 137.07°E) at 330 m depth {NWP}	Caught in bottom trawl for glass shrimp, alive	Architeuthis dux	Entire; tentacle(s) present			DML: 155 cm; EL: 630 cm	[specimen B-7 of Kubodera et al. (2016)]	Kubodera et al. (2016)	The Chunichi Shimbun 27 November 2014	Served at an event after being hard cured.
599	December 2014	off Yeongdeok-gun, North Gyeongsang Province, South Korea {NWP}	Caught alive	giant squid	Entire	Not stated		?EL: >5 m		Nam (2015)		
600 (📷)	8 December 2014	off Pohang, North Gyeongsang Province, South Korea {NWP}	Caught	giant squid	Entire; tentacles largely intact	Not stated		None given		S.-D. Kwon (2014)		Sold at Jukdo Market (Jukdo-dong, Buk-gu, Pohang) for undisclosed price.
601	9 December 2014	Kirihama beach, Takenocho, Toyooka-shi, Hyogo Prefecture, Japan (35.39°N 134.44°E) {NWP}	Found stranded on beach, dead	Architeuthis dux	Entire; tentacles missing			WL: 350 cm; WT: ~100 kg	Museum of Nature and Human Activities, Hyogo [specimen B-8 of Kubodera et al. (2016)]	Kubodera et al. (2016)		Discovered by local people and reported by T. Wada of Shimane AQUAS Aquarium.
602 (📷)	22 December 2014	Jukbyeon Port, Jukbyeon-myeon, Uljin-gun, North Gyeongsang Province, South Korea {NWP}	Caught in fixed net	giant squid	Entire; tentacles and reddish skin missing	None?		?WL: >4 m		[Anon.] (2014z)		Caught around 6 am by 20-ton Jukbyeon fishing vessel. Sold at auction for 80,000 won (equivalent to US$76 in 2025). Purchased by Lee Jun-ho of Jukbyeon's Wangdolhoe Center to be served to customers as fried food (flesh considered too thick for sashimi).
603 (📷)	23 December 2014	off Ineura, Ine, Kyoto Prefecture, Japan (35.38°N 135.17°E) at <60 m depth {NWP}	Caught in fixed net, alive	Architeuthis dux	Entire; tentacles missing	Entire		WL: 3.2 m [~2.5 m after drying]; BL+HL?: 2.3 m; WT: ~70 kg	Kyoto Aquarium [specimen B-9 of Kubodera et al. (2016)]	[Anon.] (2014aa); [Anon.] (2015c); [Anon.] (2015d); [Anon.] (2015e); [Anon.] (2015f); [Anon.] (2016); Kubodera et al. (2016)	Shimada et al. (2017:9)	On public display. Died during retrieval. Stored frozen at Kyoto Aquarium where on public display 24–25 December 2014; subsequently sent to research facility. Specially dried by seafood processing company Gogyofuku Co. over 8 days beginning on 16 July 2015 (this process takes half a day for a squid of normal size); shrunk considerably during processing. Displayed at Suma Aqualife Park in Kobe from 30 July to 8 November 2015, and in Kyoto Aquarium from 20 April 2016.
604	24 December 2014	Honjyo beach, Ine, Kyoto Prefecture, Japan (35.43°N 135.16°E) {NWP}	Found stranded on beach, dead	Architeuthis dux	Entire; only one tentacle present			DML: 178 cm; EL: 507 cm; WT: ~100 kg	[specimen B-10 of Kubodera et al. (2016)]	Kubodera et al. (2016)		Discovered by local people and reported by Y. Ueno of the Fisheries Technology Department, Kyoto Prefectural Agriculture, Forestry and Fisheries Technology Center, which recovered the specimen.
605 (📷)	28 December 2014	600 m off Tomari, Obama-shi, Fukui Prefecture, Japan (35.32°N 135.42°E) at <20 m depth {NWP}	Caught in fixed net, alive	Architeuthis dux	Entire; tentacles missing	None; returned to sea		WL: ~300 cm	[specimen B-11 of Kubodera et al. (2016)]	Kubodera et al. (2016); [Echizen] (N.d.)	Fukui Shimbun 28 December 2014	Squid moved limbs only slightly when found. Further details not recorded as specimen was returned to sea before Echizen Matsushima Aquarium were notified of find.
606 (📷)	31 December 2014	2 km off Toyama-shi, Toyama Prefecture, Japan (36.47°N 137.13°E) at <100 m depth {NWP}	Caught in fixed net, filmed alive	Architeuthis dux	Entire; tentacles missing			?WL: ~6 m	[specimen B-12 of Kubodera et al. (2016)]	[Anon.] (2014ab); Kubodera et al. (2016)		Video footage recorded.

== Specimen images ==
The following images relate to 21st century giant squid specimens and sightings. The number below each image corresponds to that given in the List of giant squid table and is linked to the relevant record therein. The date on which the specimen was first documented is also given (the little-endian day/month/year date format is used throughout).

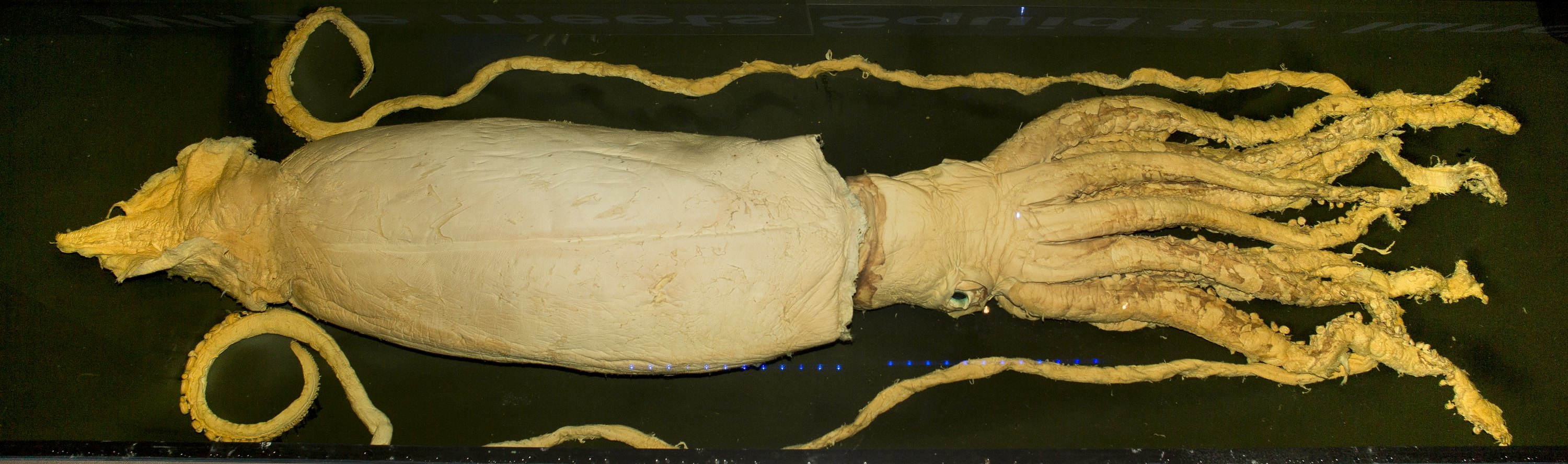
#442 (26 January 2001)
Giant squid caught by trawl off Sandy Cape, Tasmania, on 26 January 2001, on display at Melbourne Museum

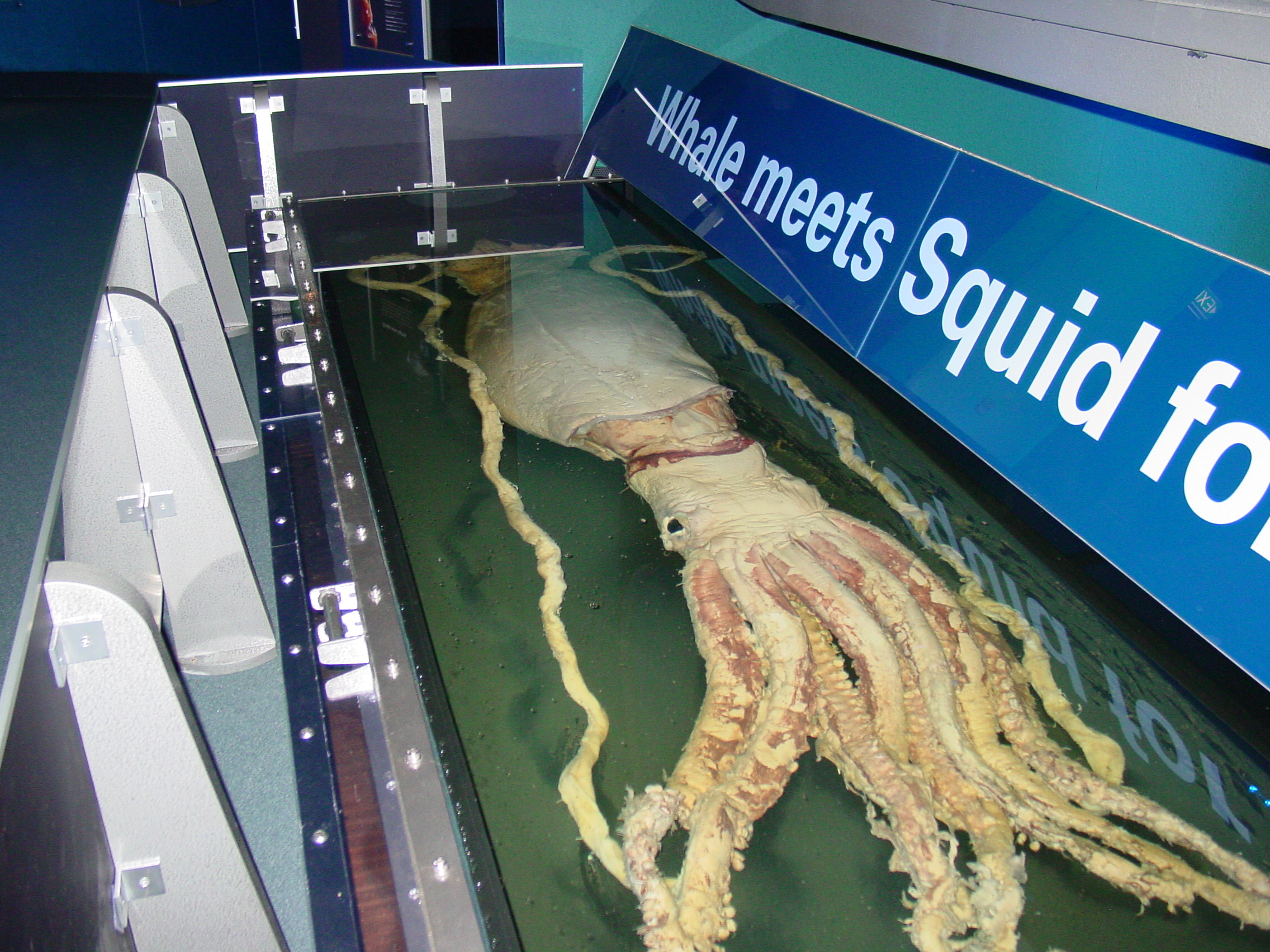
#442 (26 January 2001)
Same specimen as it appeared on public display at Melbourne Museum in 2006

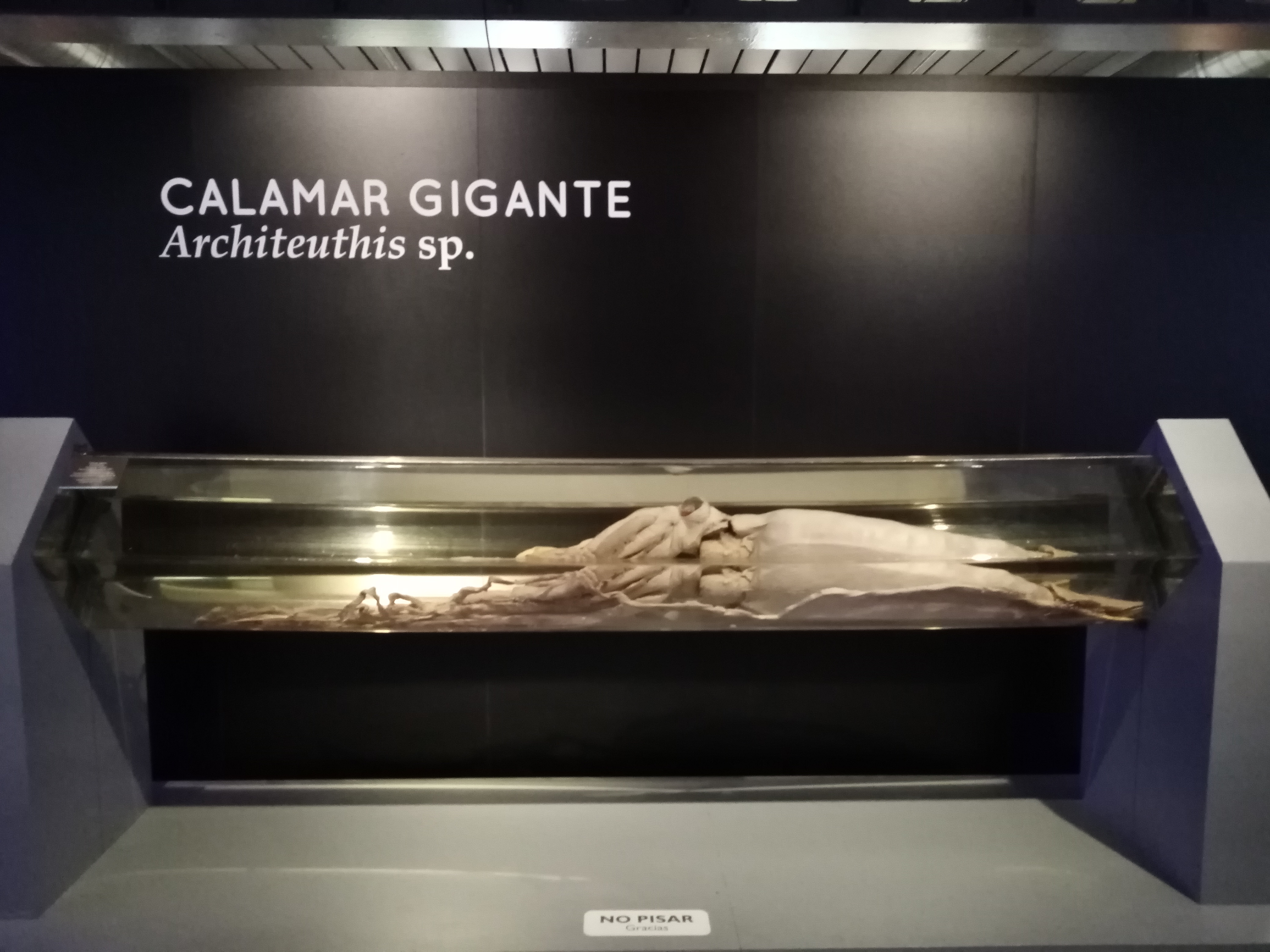
#447 (25 June 2001)
Giant squid preserved at the Museo Nacional de Ciencias Naturales in Madrid

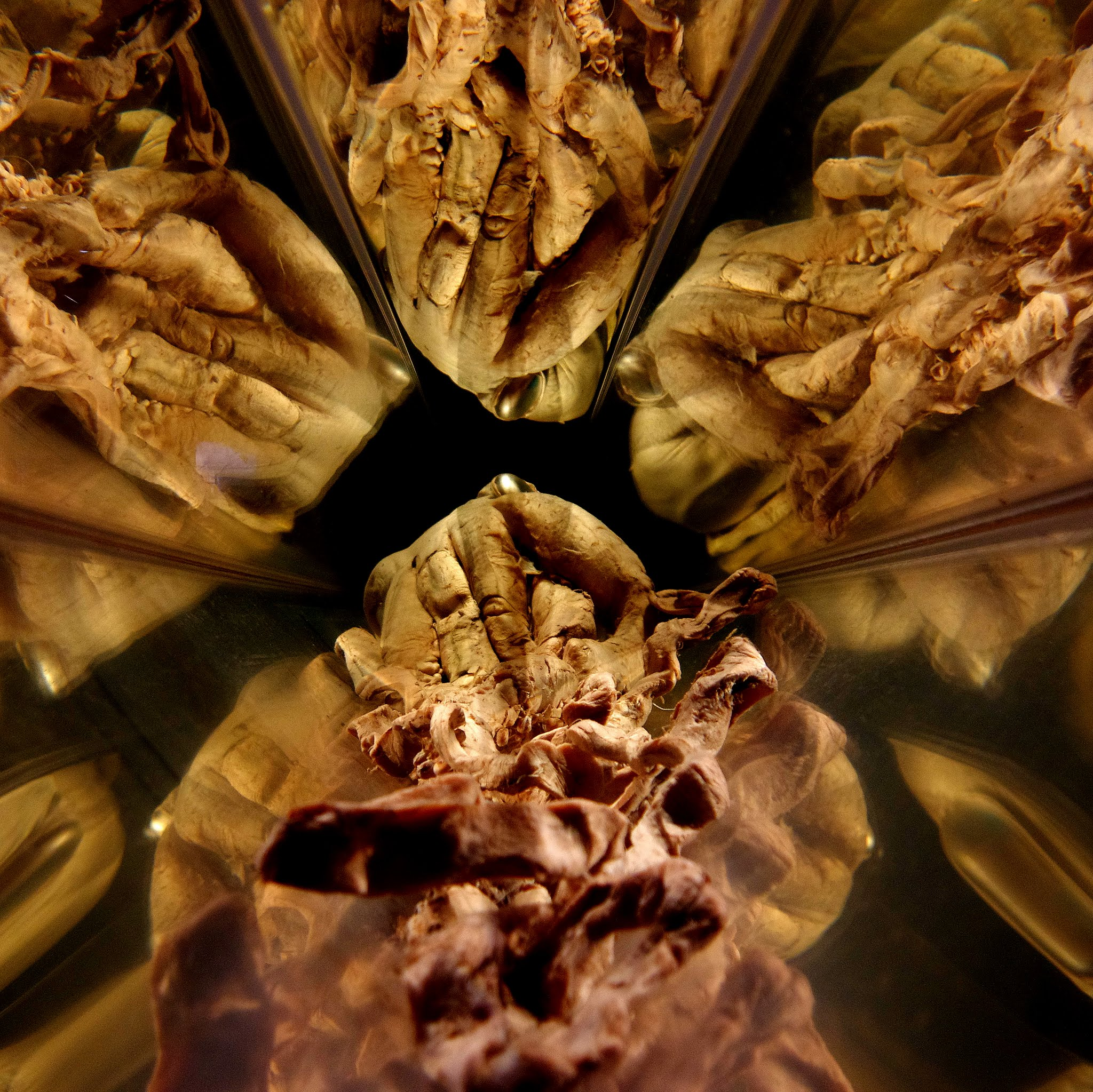
#447 (25 June 2001)
Oral view of the same specimen with multiple reflections thereof (see alternative view)

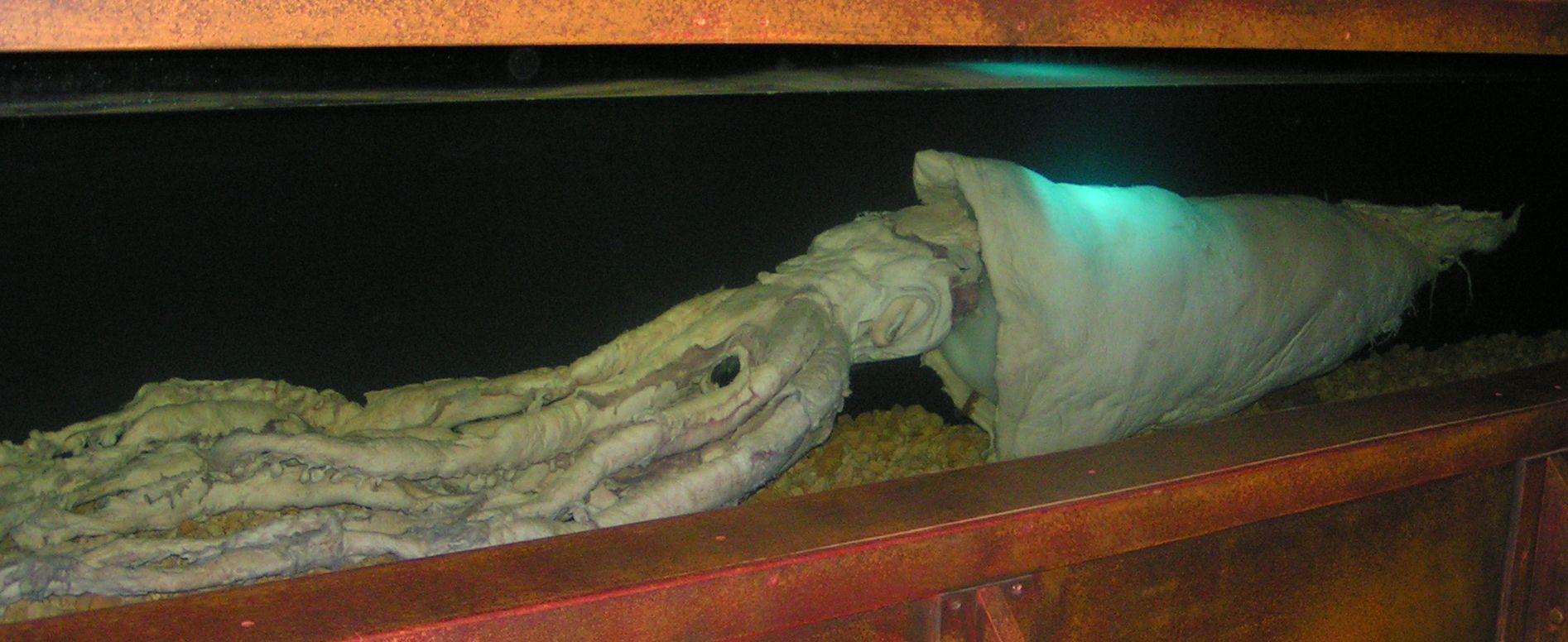
#463 (3/1/2002)
Giant squid caught around 160 km off the Hebrides, preserved at the National Marine Aquarium in Plymouth, England

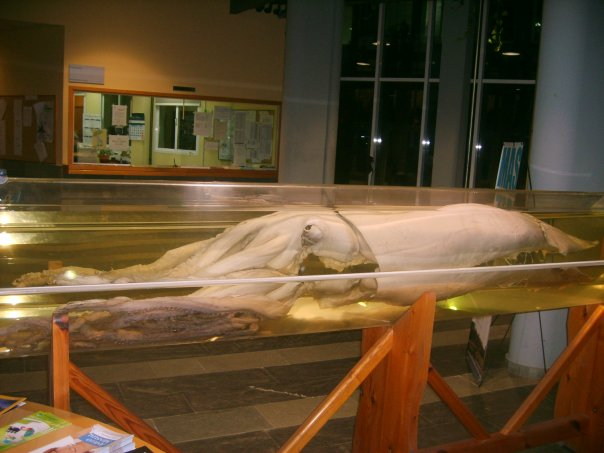
(?/?/2003)
Giant squid on display at the Faculty of Marine Sciences, University of Vigo

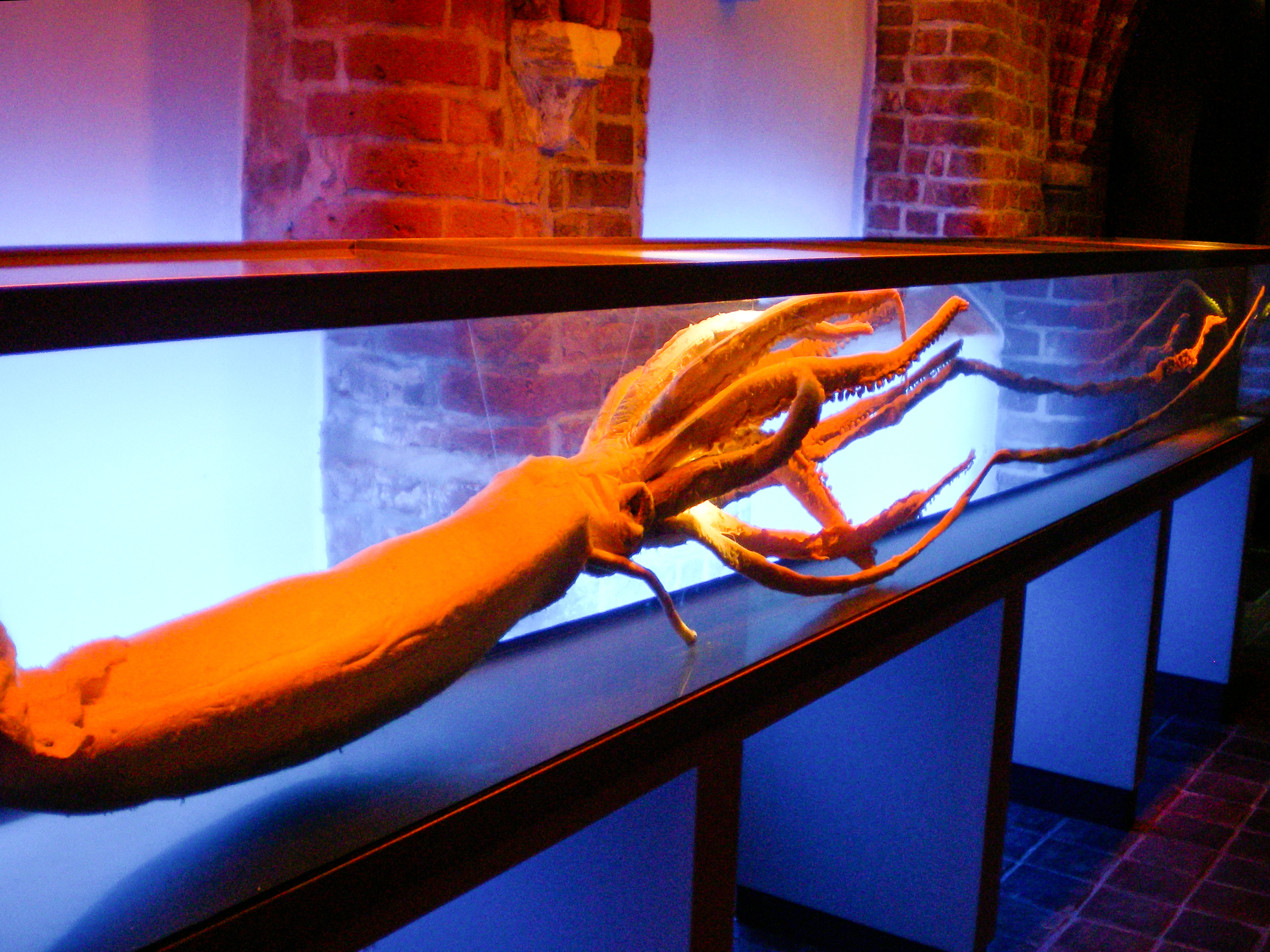
#478 (?/8/2003)
Giant squid specimen with tentacles fully extended, exhibited at the German Oceanographic Museum in Stralsund

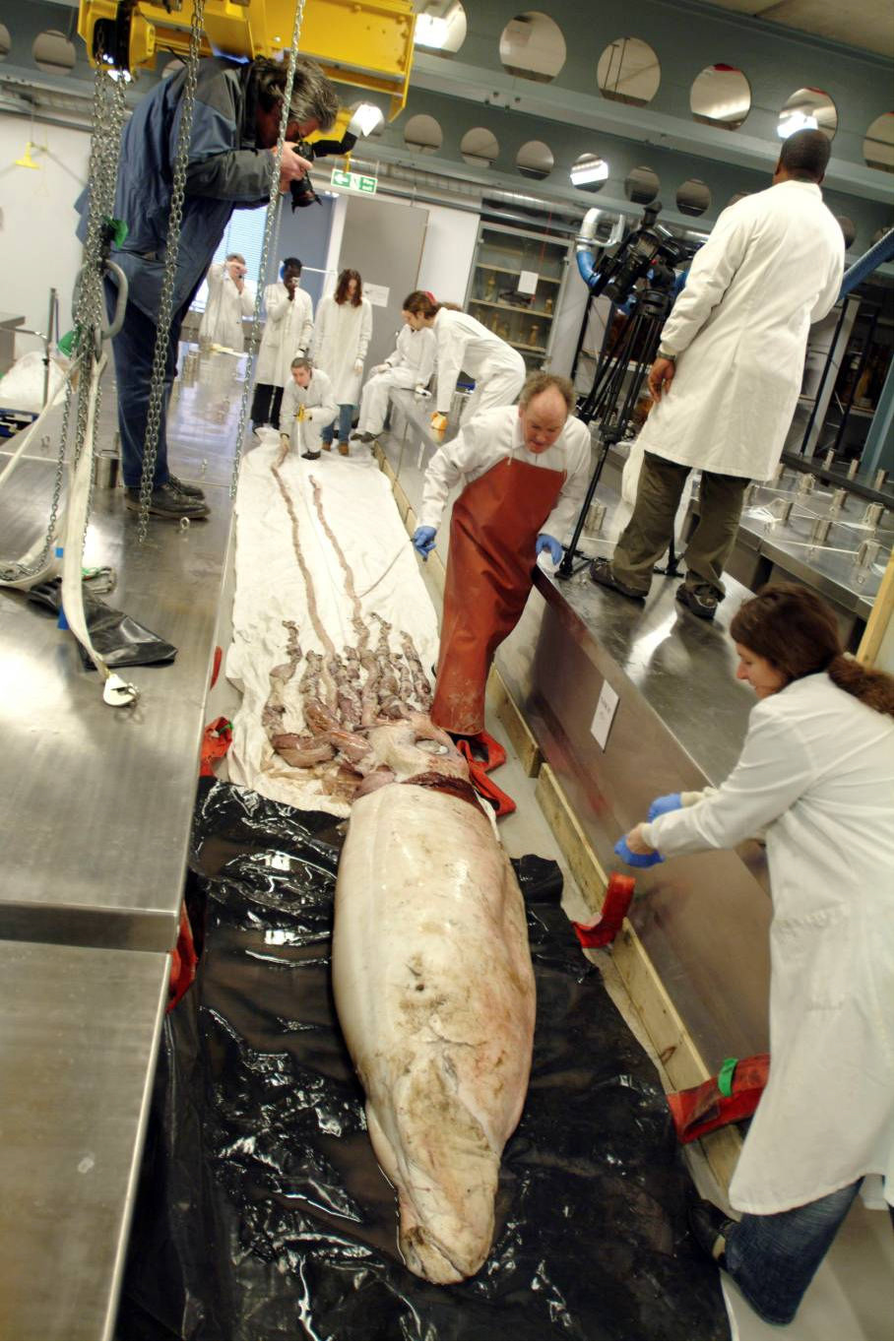
#487 (15 March 2004)
Specimen nicknamed "Archie" being imaged and measured in the Tank Room of the Natural History Museum (NHM) in London

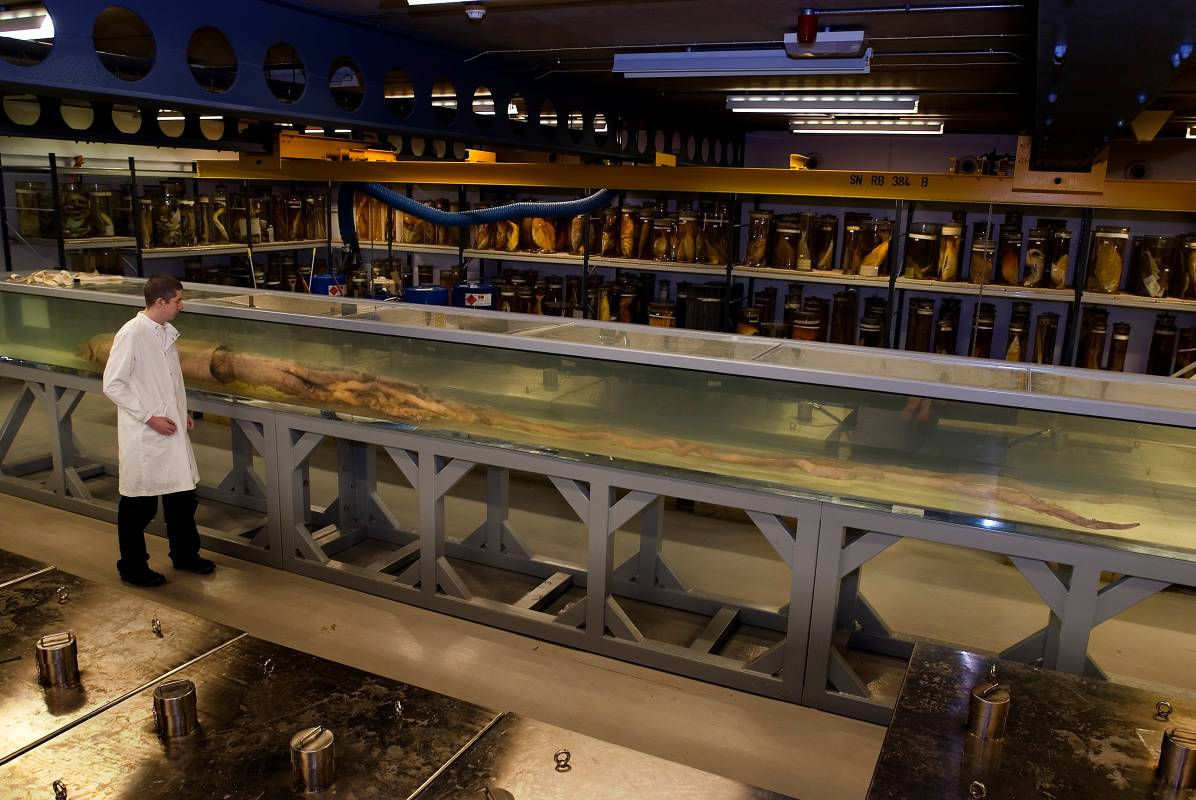
#487 (15 March 2004)
"Archie" preserved in a 9.45 m-long acrylic tank at London's Natural History Museum

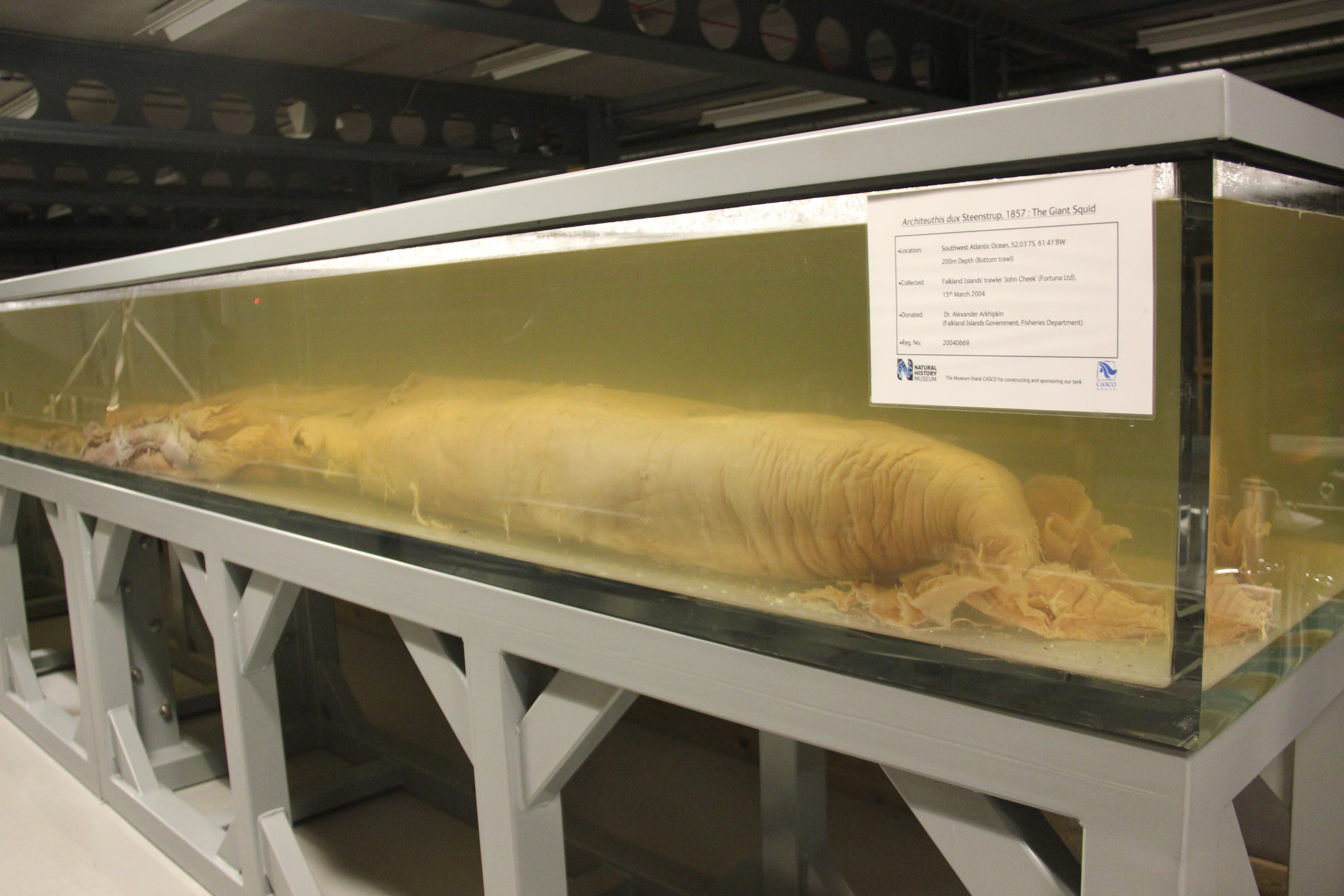
#487 (15 March 2004)
Same specimen as it appeared in 2015, with provenance information displayed on the side of the tank

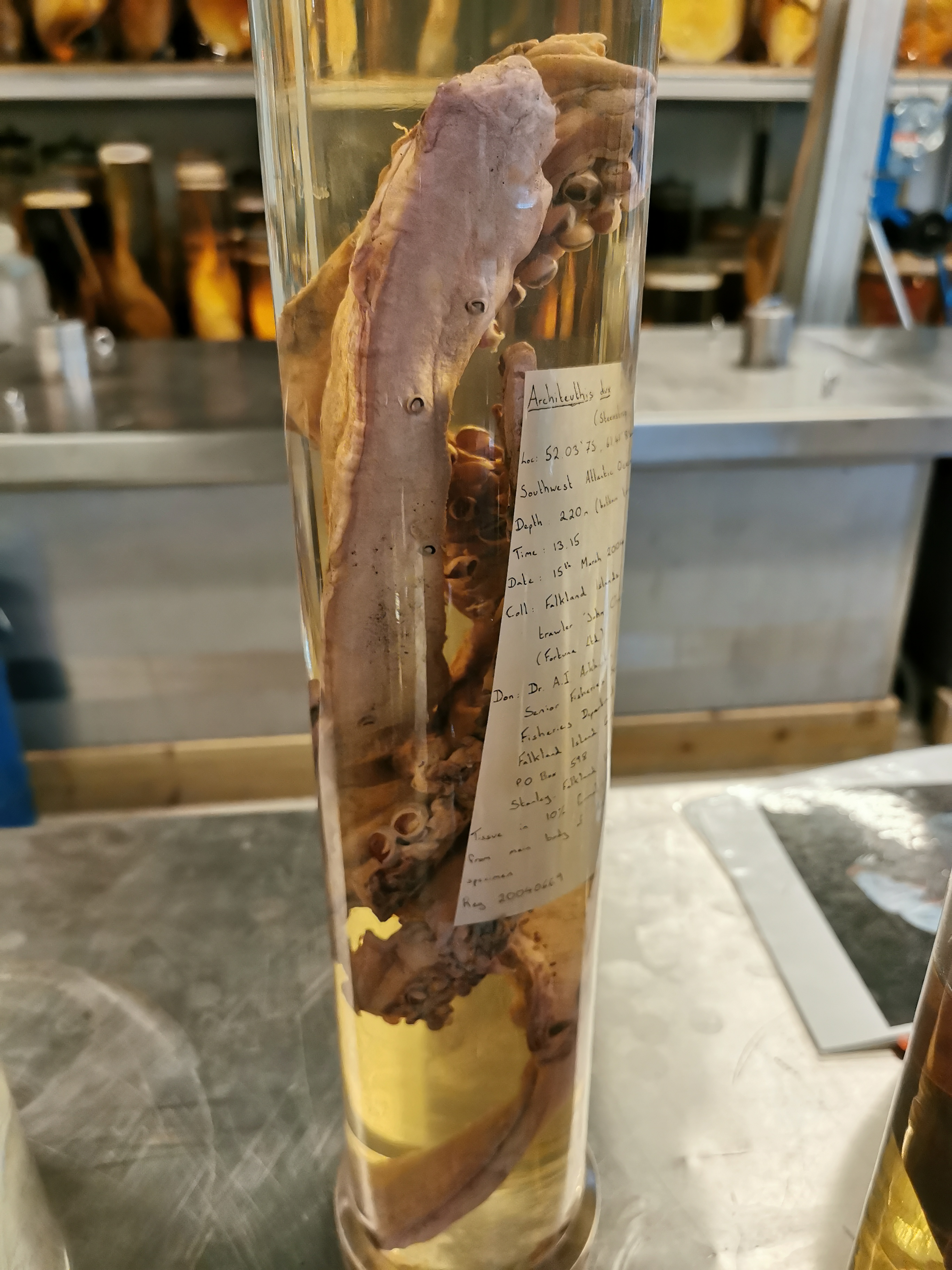
#487 (15 March 2004)
Additional limb remains from the "Archie" specimen, stored in a separate vessel filled with 10% formol-saline, on display as part of the NHM's Spirit Collection Tour (see also specimen label)

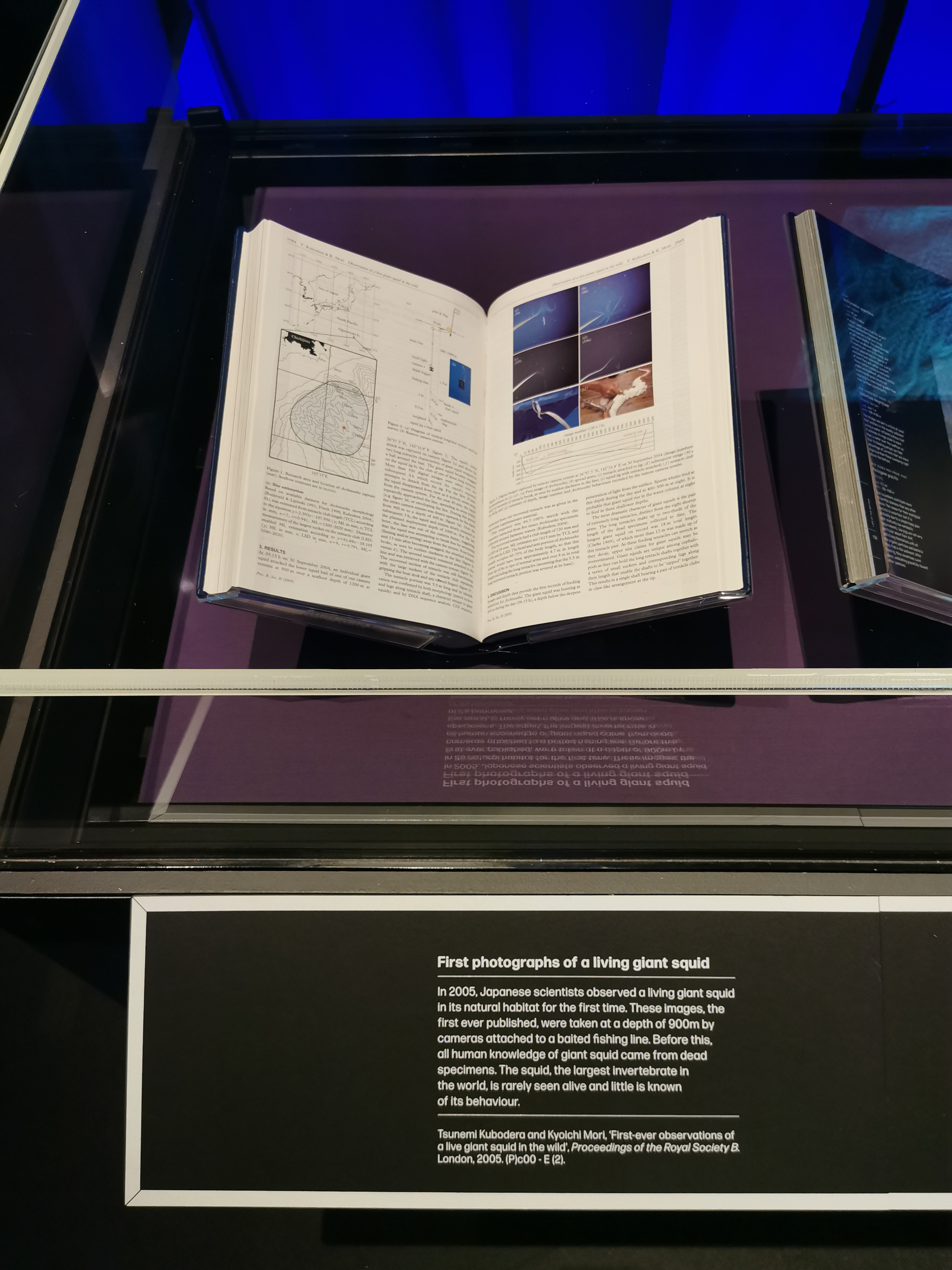
#492 (30 September 2004)
Paper detailing the first observations of a live giant squid in its natural deep-water habitat, exhibited as part of the "Animals: Art, Science & Sound" exhibition (21 April – 28 August 2023) at the British Library in London. The year of the observations is incorrectly given as 2005 (the year of their publication).

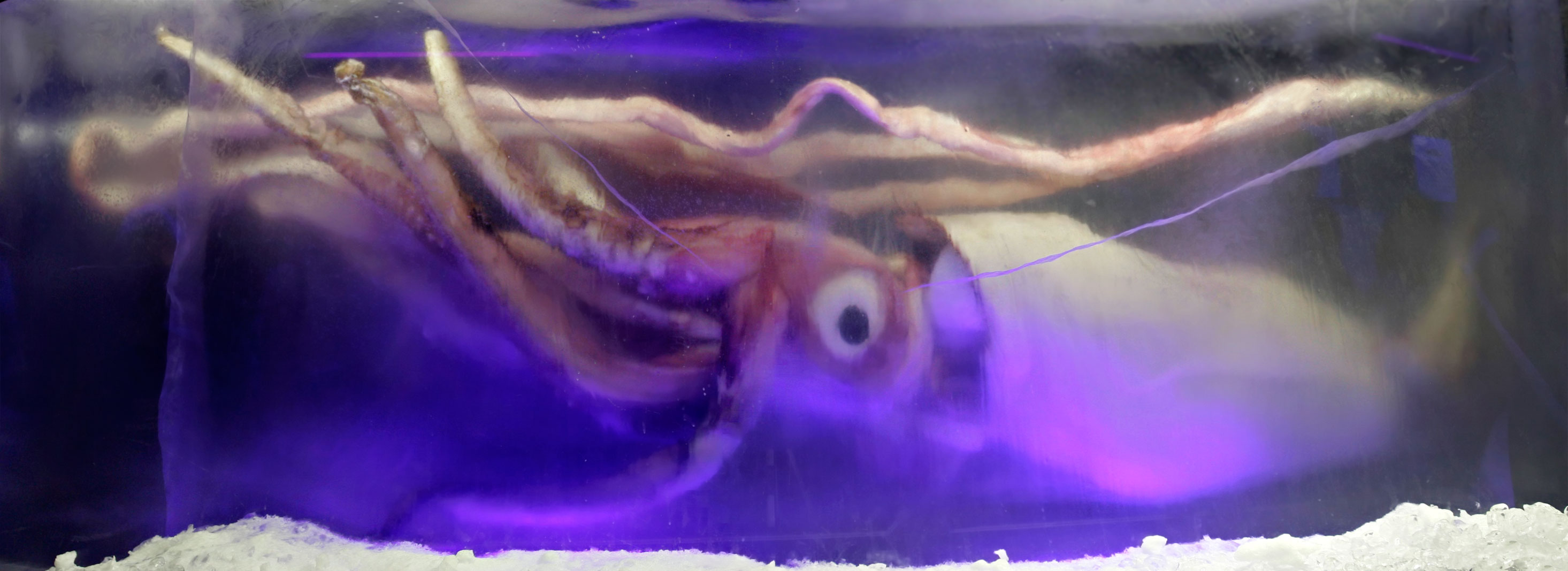
#495 (?/?/2005)
Giant squid measuring 6.75 m encased in a 3.5-tonne block of ice at the Melbourne Aquarium in early 2006

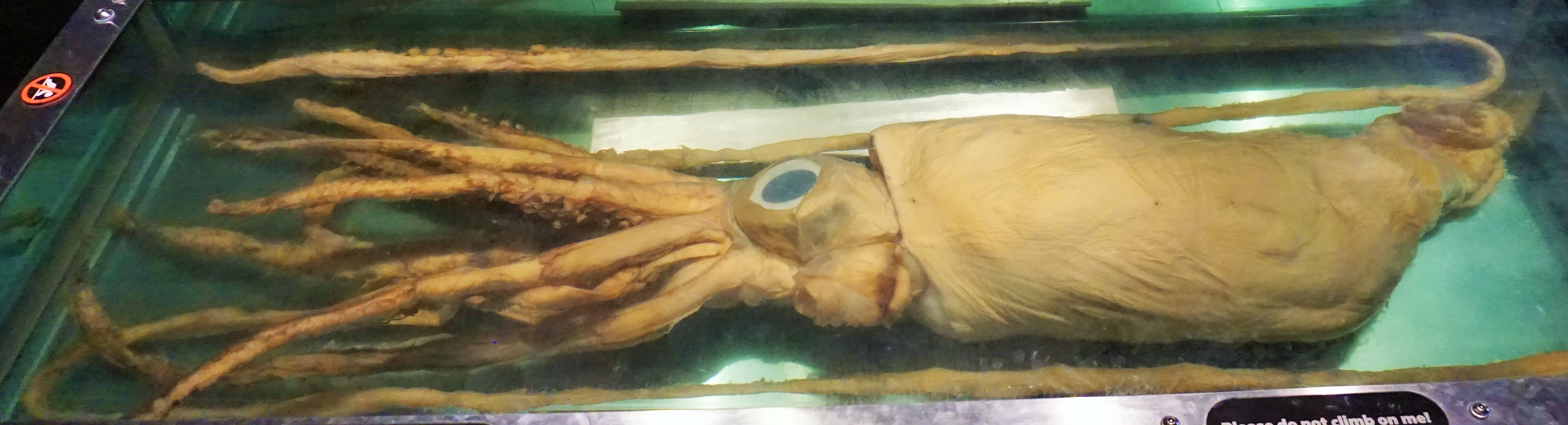
#495 (?/?/2005)
Same specimen on display at the Queensland Museum in August 2017, after being thawed and preserved in ethanol

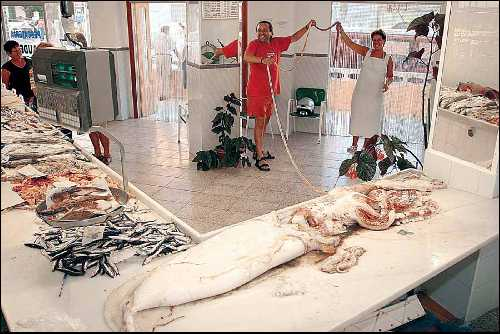
(?/7/2005)
Male specimen caught in Spanish waters in July 2005

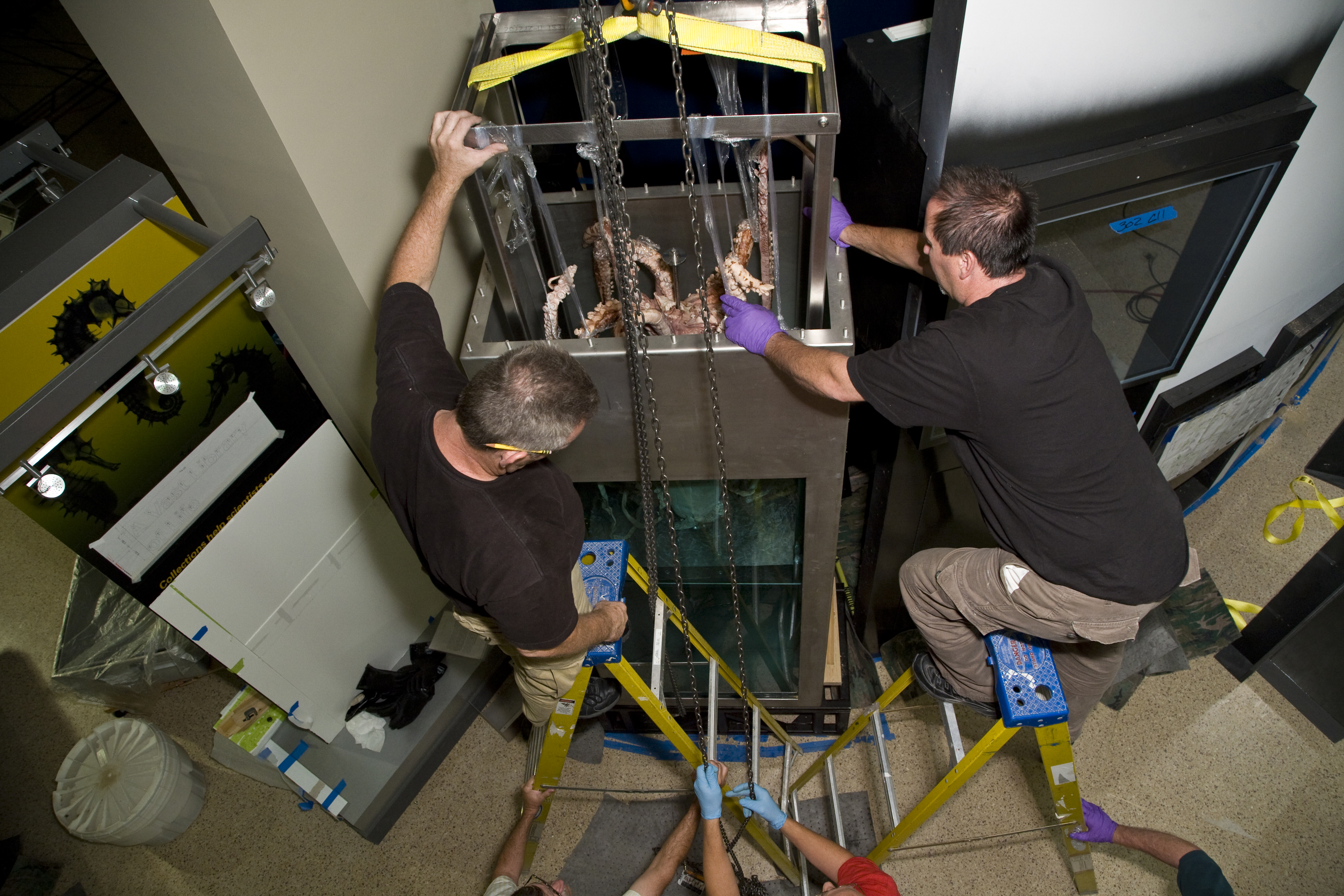
(?/7/2005)
Same specimen being lowered into its final position at the Sant Ocean Hall of the National Museum of Natural History (NMNH) in Washington, D.C. Both specimens currently on display at the NMNH were flown from Spain aboard a C-17 Globemaster III as part of "Operation Calamari".

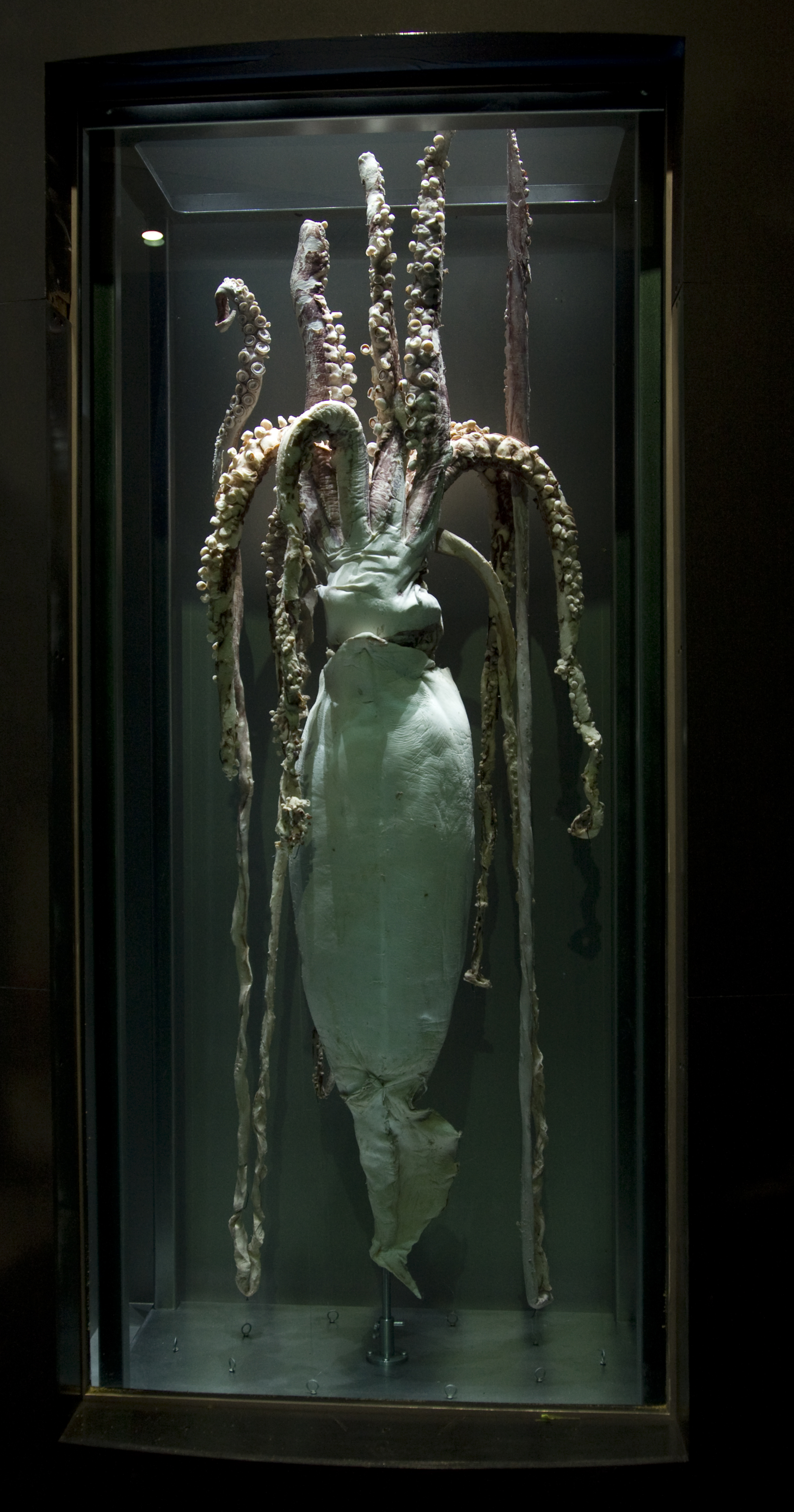
(?/7/2005)
Same specimen on display at the NMNH, one of the few publicly exhibited male specimens worldwide

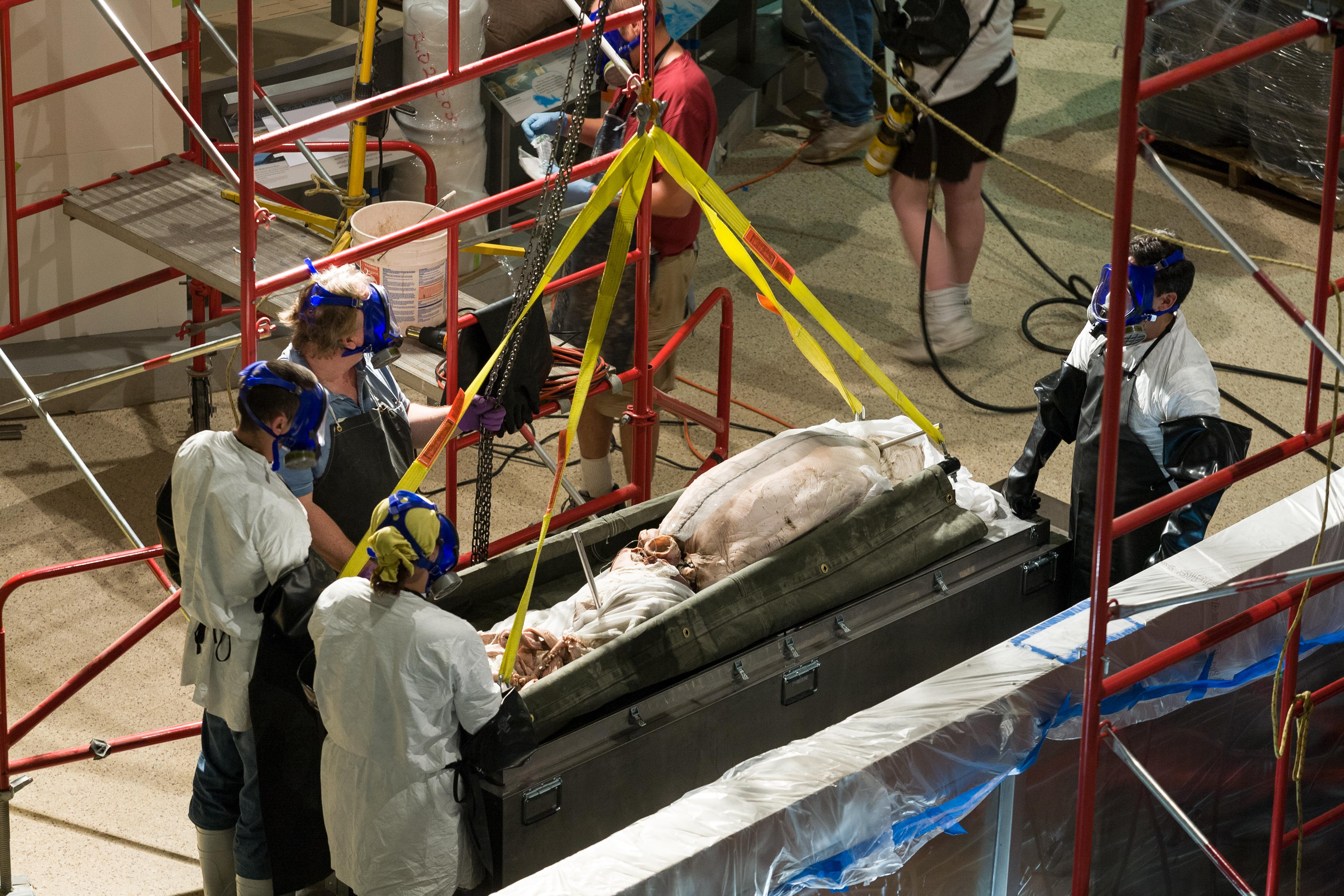
(?/7/2005)
Giant squid being removed from its formalin preservative at the Smithsonian's Museum Support Center in Suitland, Maryland, surrounded by workers in full-face elastomeric respirators

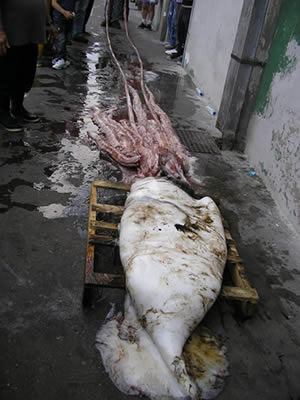
(?/7/2005)
Large female caught off northern Spain

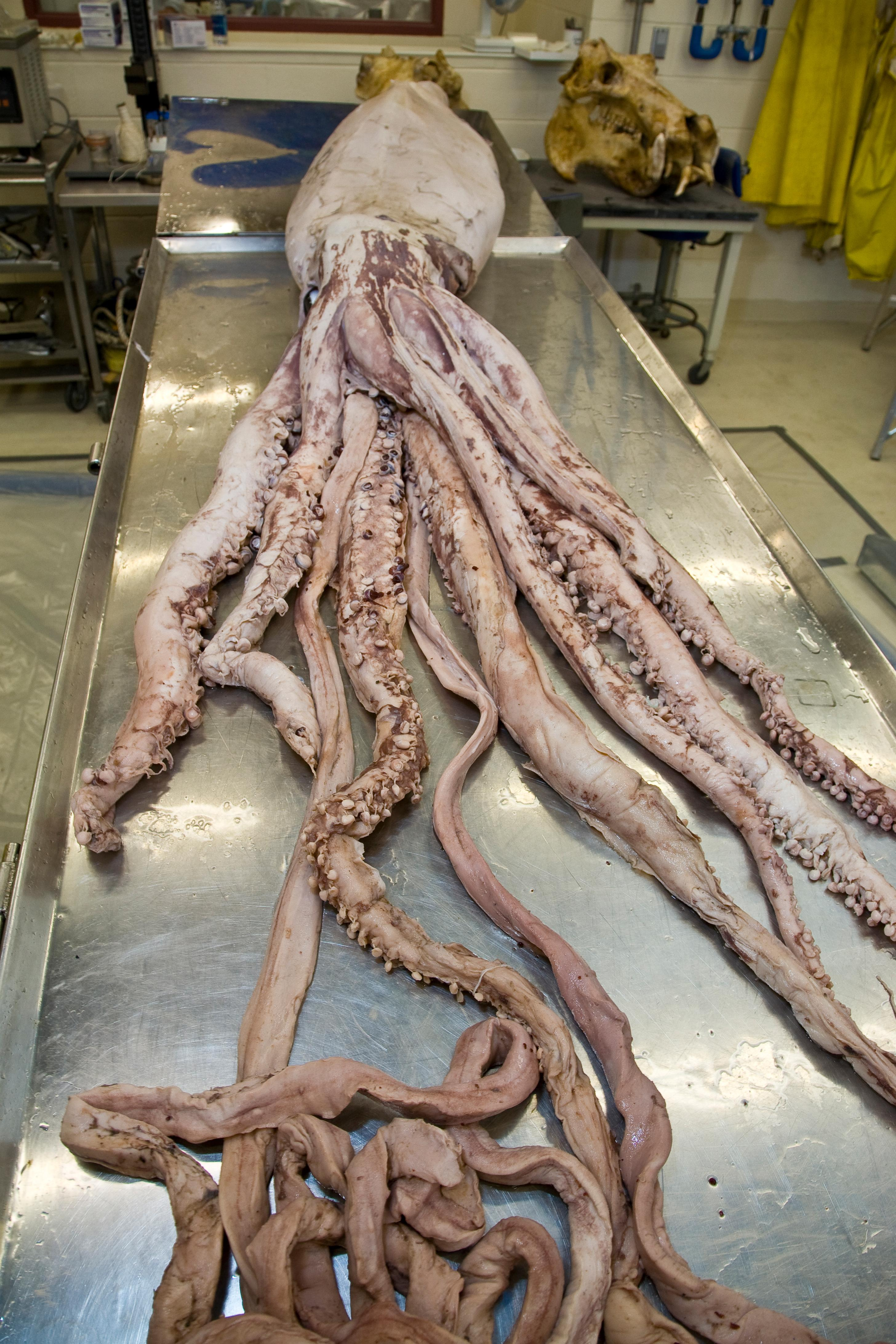
(?/7/2005)
Same specimen being prepared for display at the National Museum of Natural History

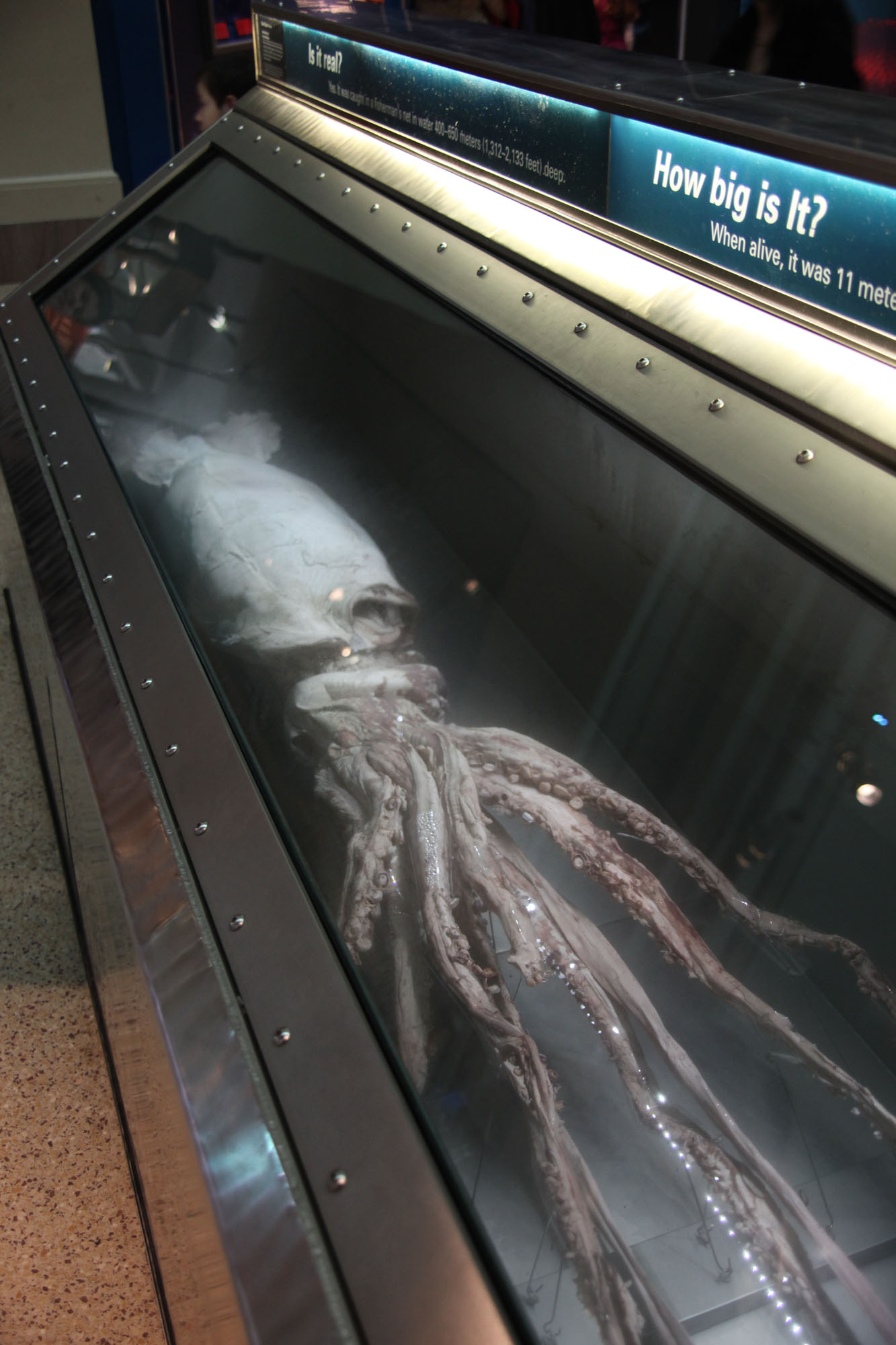
(?/7/2005)
Same specimen on display at the NMNH's Sant Ocean Hall, preserved in Novec 7100 fluid. Both of the museum's exhibited giant squid originated from CEPESMA (which managed Museo del Calamar Gigante in Luarca, Asturias) and were prepared by the ECOBIOMAR group of CSIC's Instituto de Investigacións Mariñas in Vigo, Galicia.

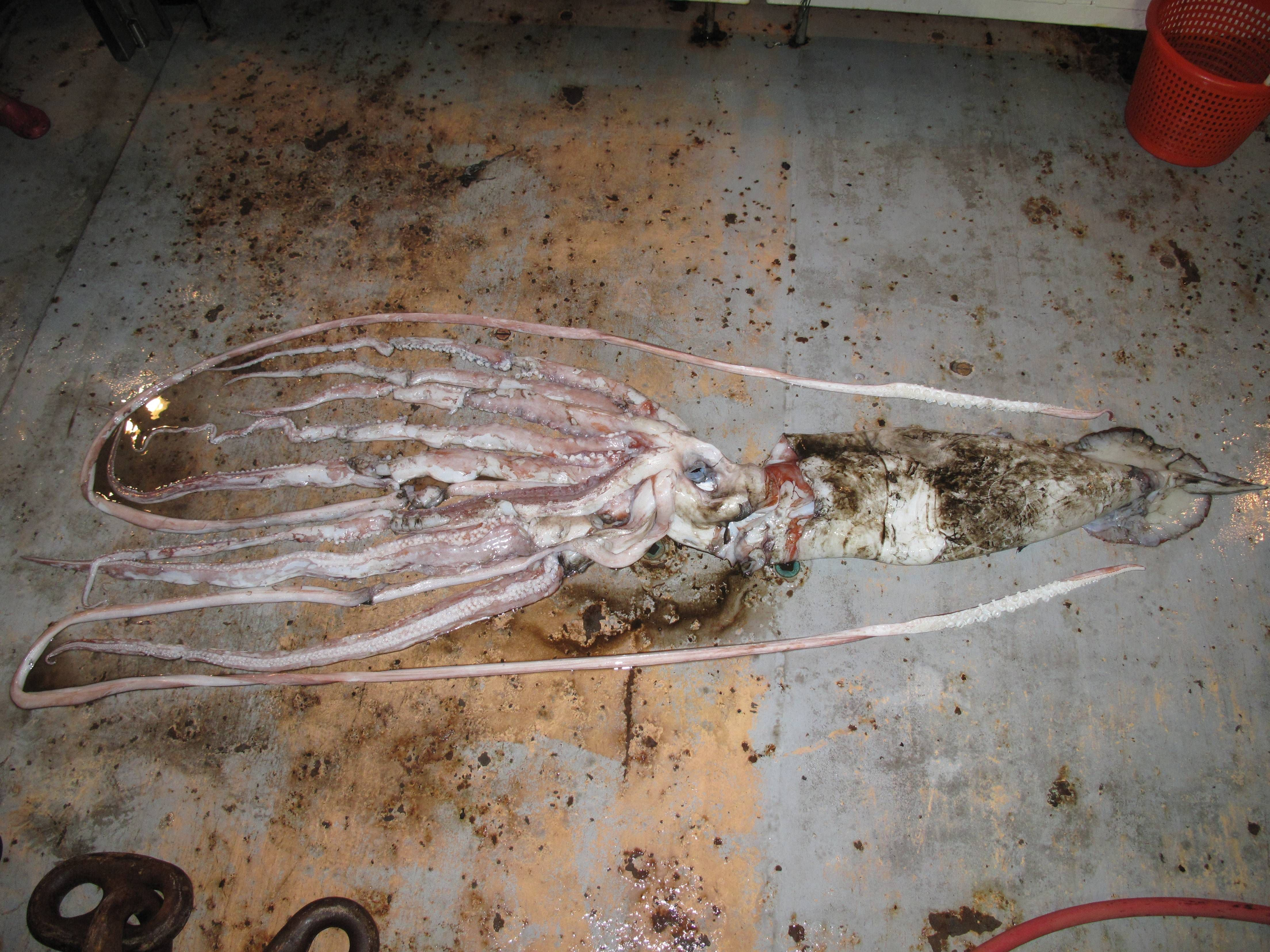
#532 (30 July 2009)
Small female trawl netted in the Gulf of Mexico off the US state of Louisiana on 30 July 2009. It now forms part of the collections of the National Museum of Natural History in Washington, D.C.

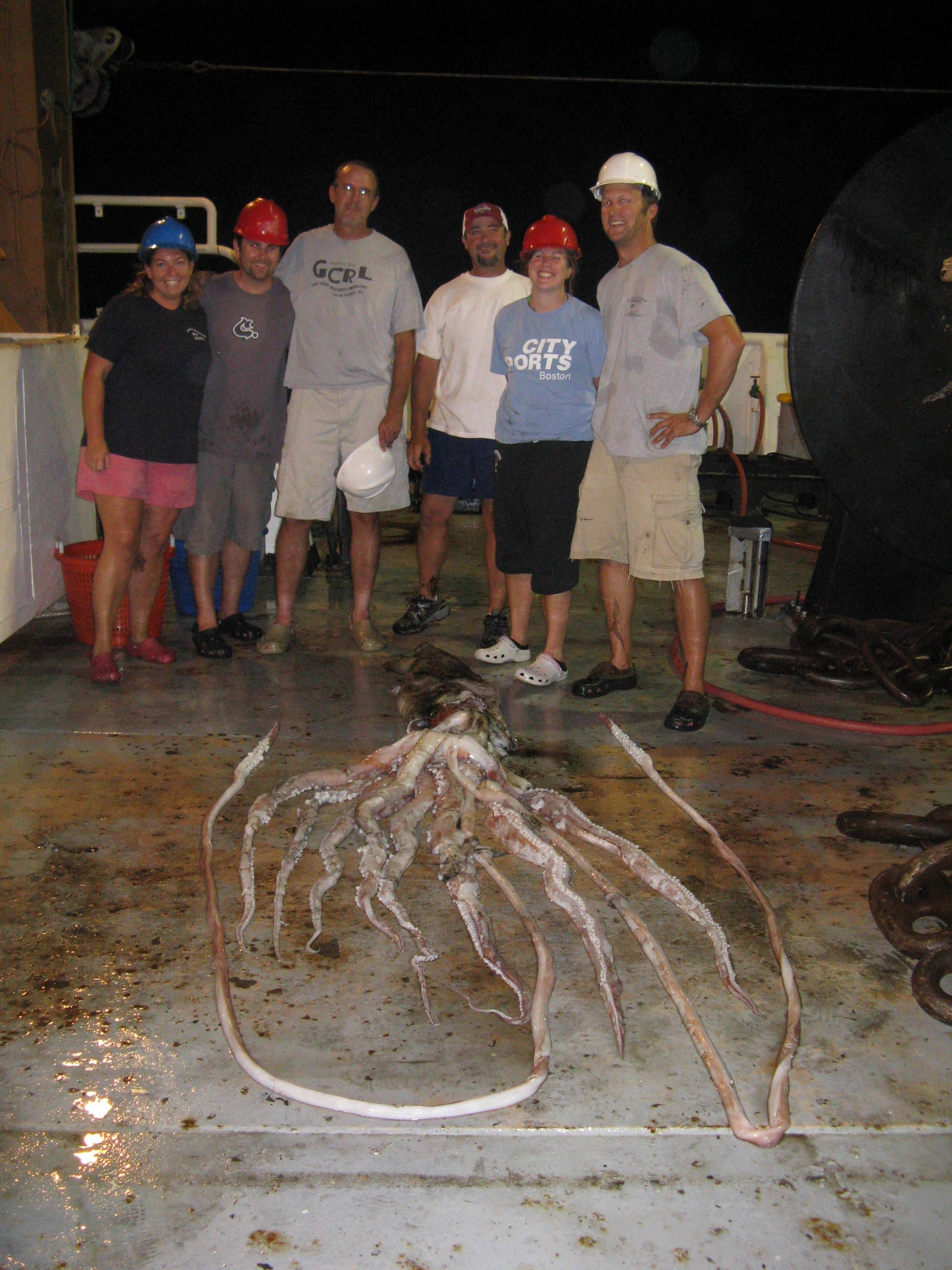
#532 (30 July 2009)
Another view of the same specimen surrounded by research scientists on the deck of the NOAA research vessel Gordon Gunter (see alternative view)

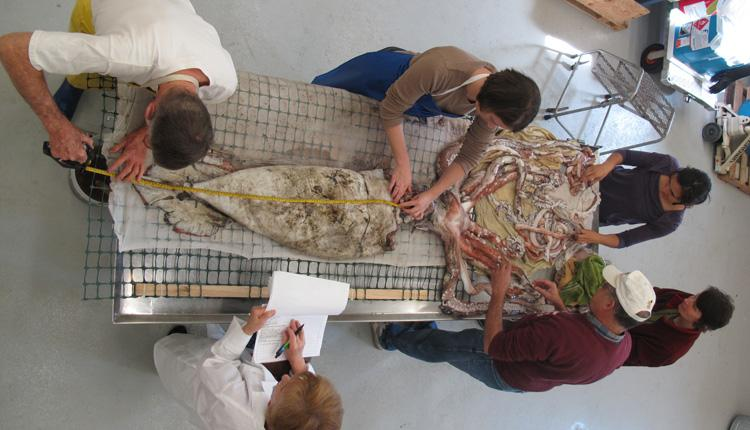
#532 (30 July 2009)
Same specimen being prepared for dissection by Clyde Roper (top left) and other scientists from the Smithsonian Institution, NOAA, and the Delaware Museum of Natural History, including Paula Rothman, Elizabeth Shea, and Michael Vecchione

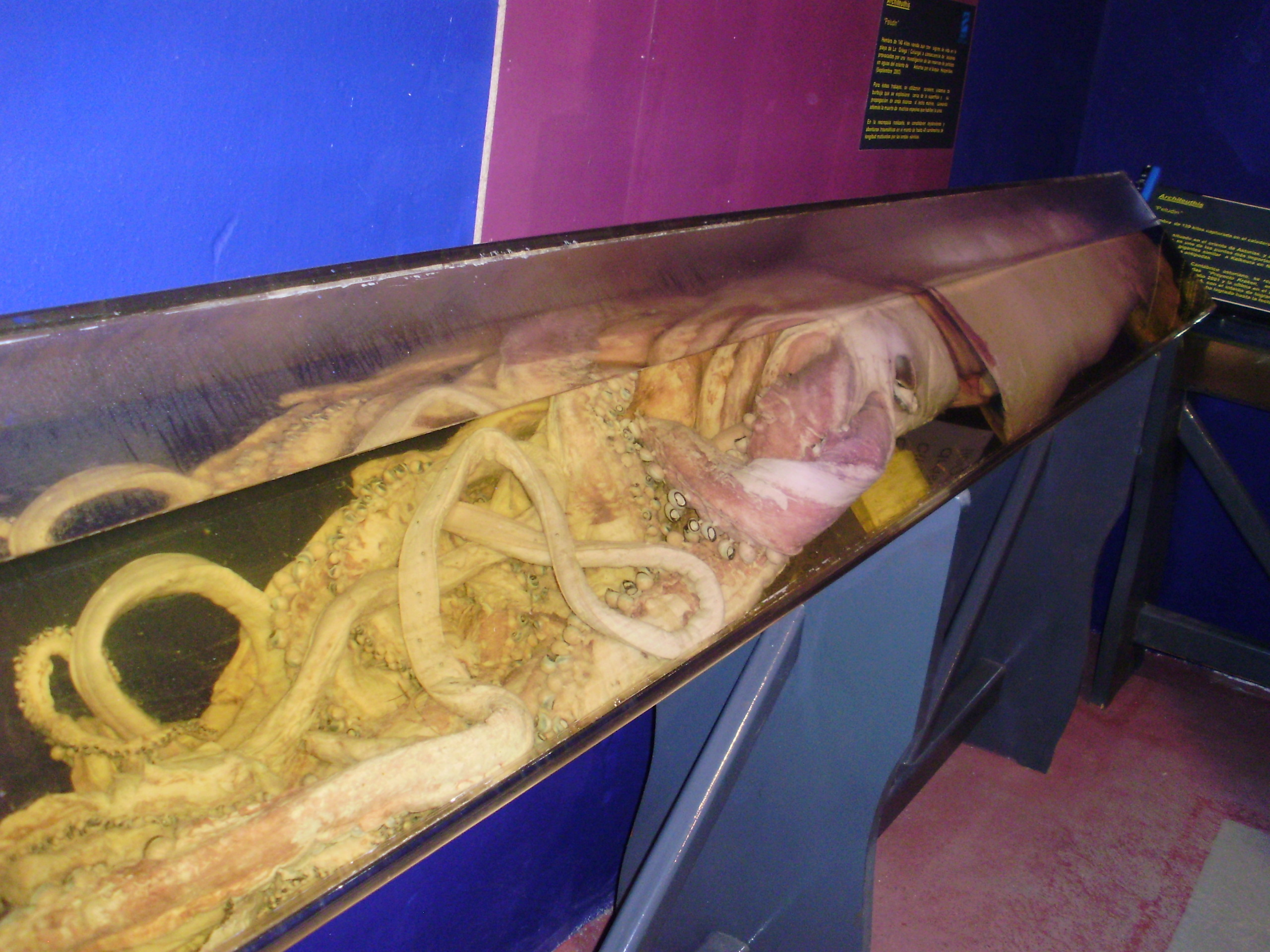
Specimen exhibited at CEPESMA's Aula del Mar ("Classroom of the Sea") in Luarca, Asturias, Spain, in September 2009, prior to the opening of the organisation's dedicated museum, Museo del Calamar Gigante, the following year

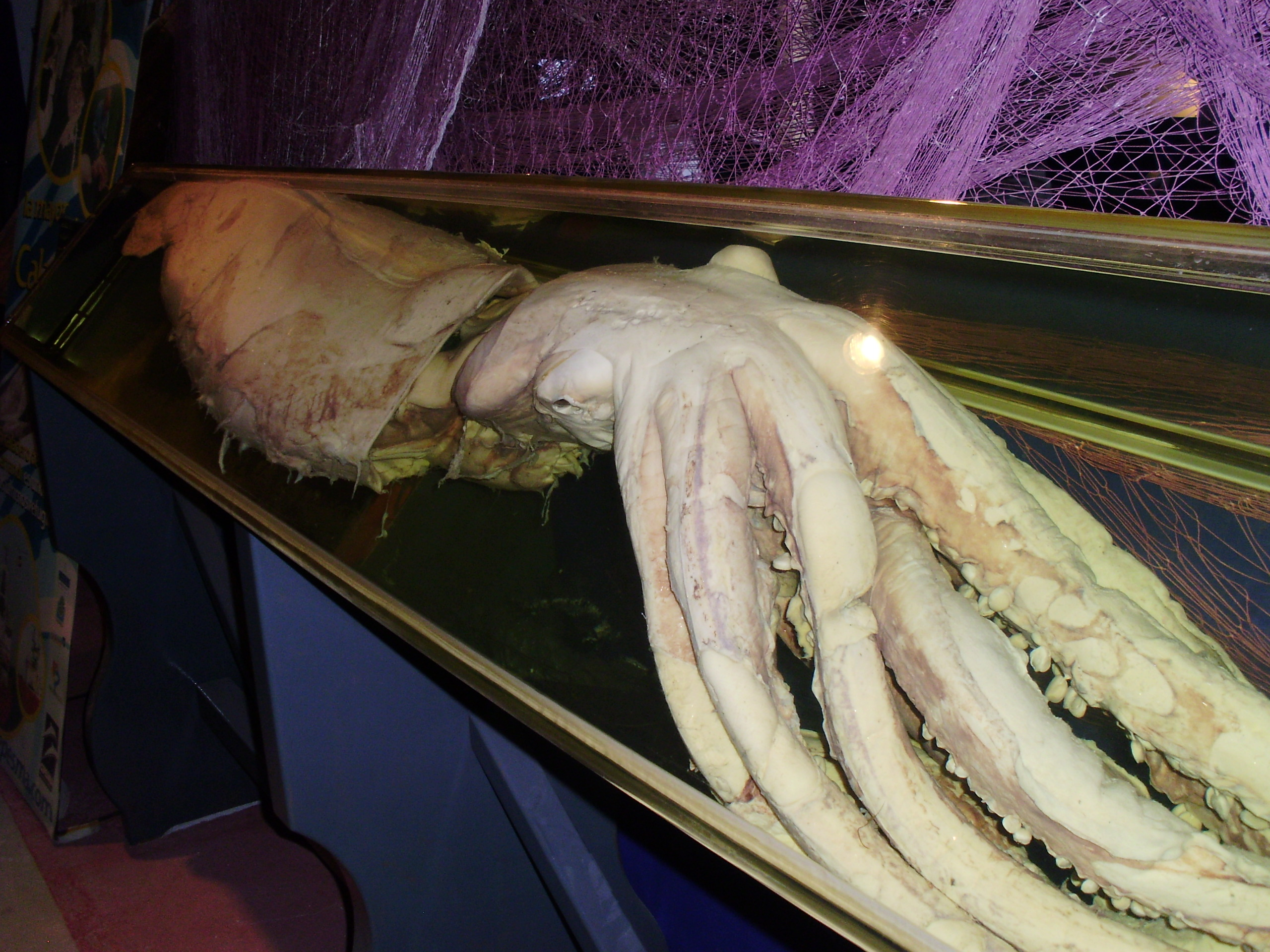
Another CEPESMA specimen exhibited at Aula del Mar in September 2009; at the time it had the world's largest collection of giant squid on public display

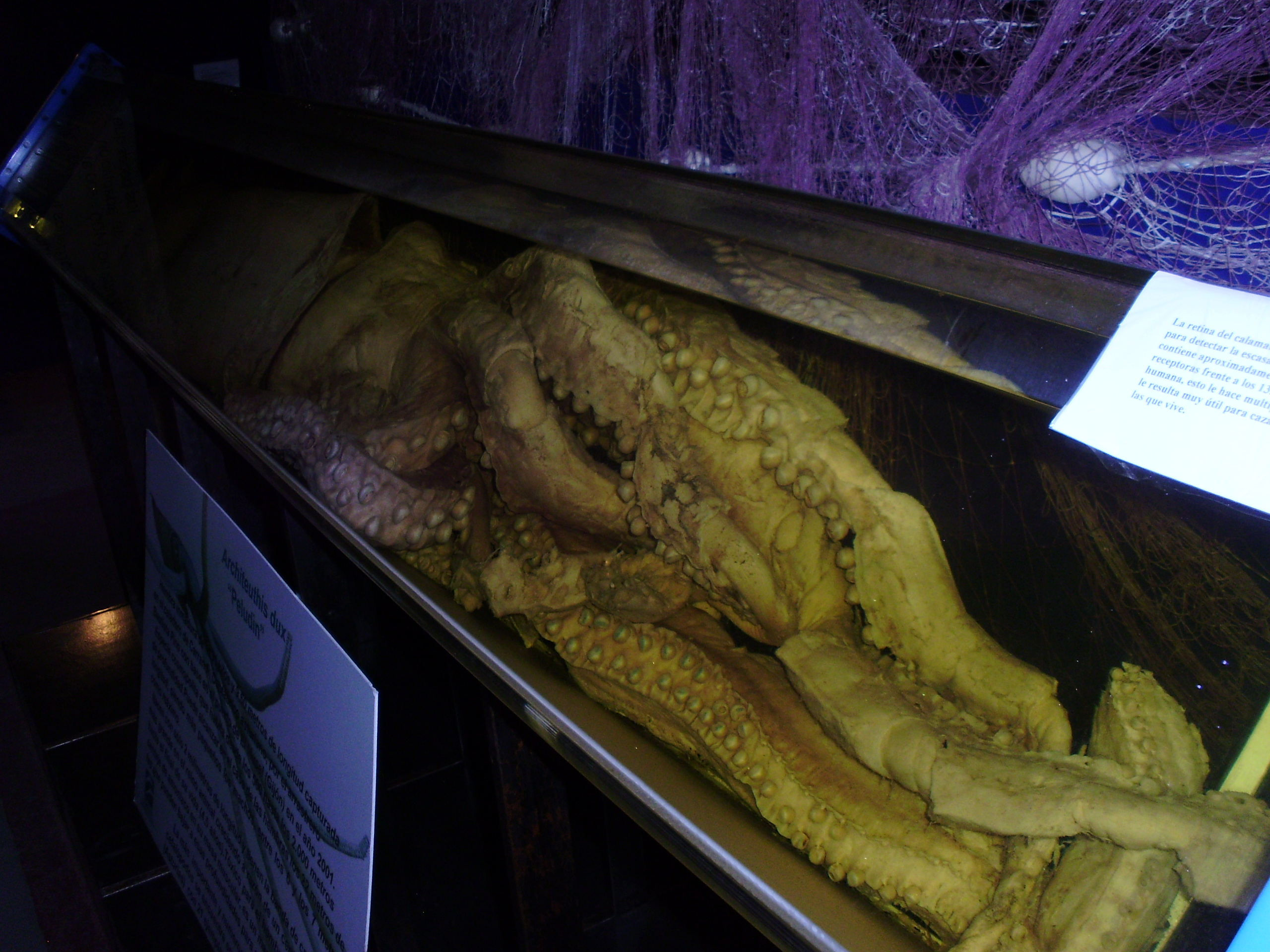
A third specimen at Aula del Mar, September 2009

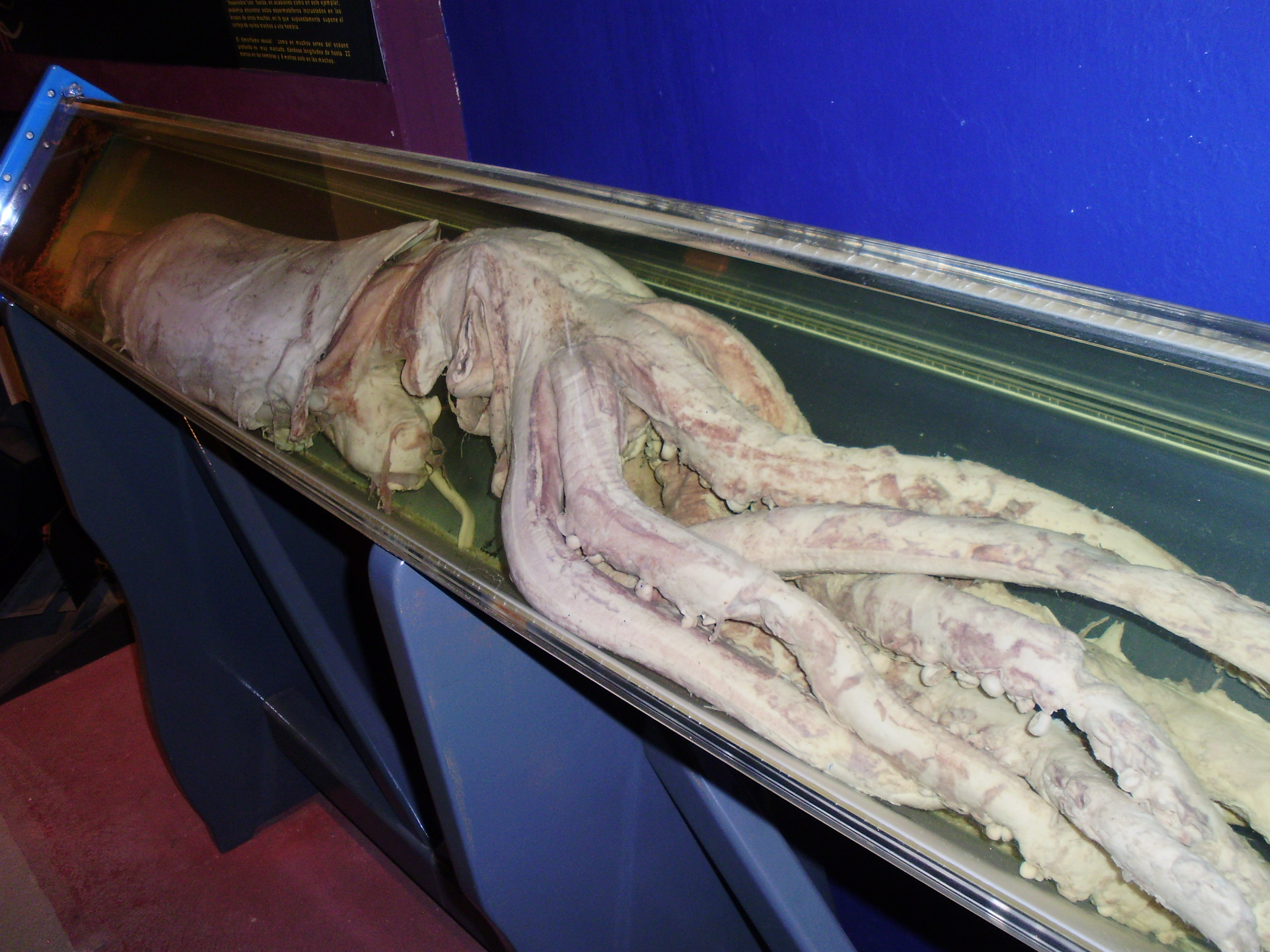
A fourth specimen at Aula del Mar, September 2009

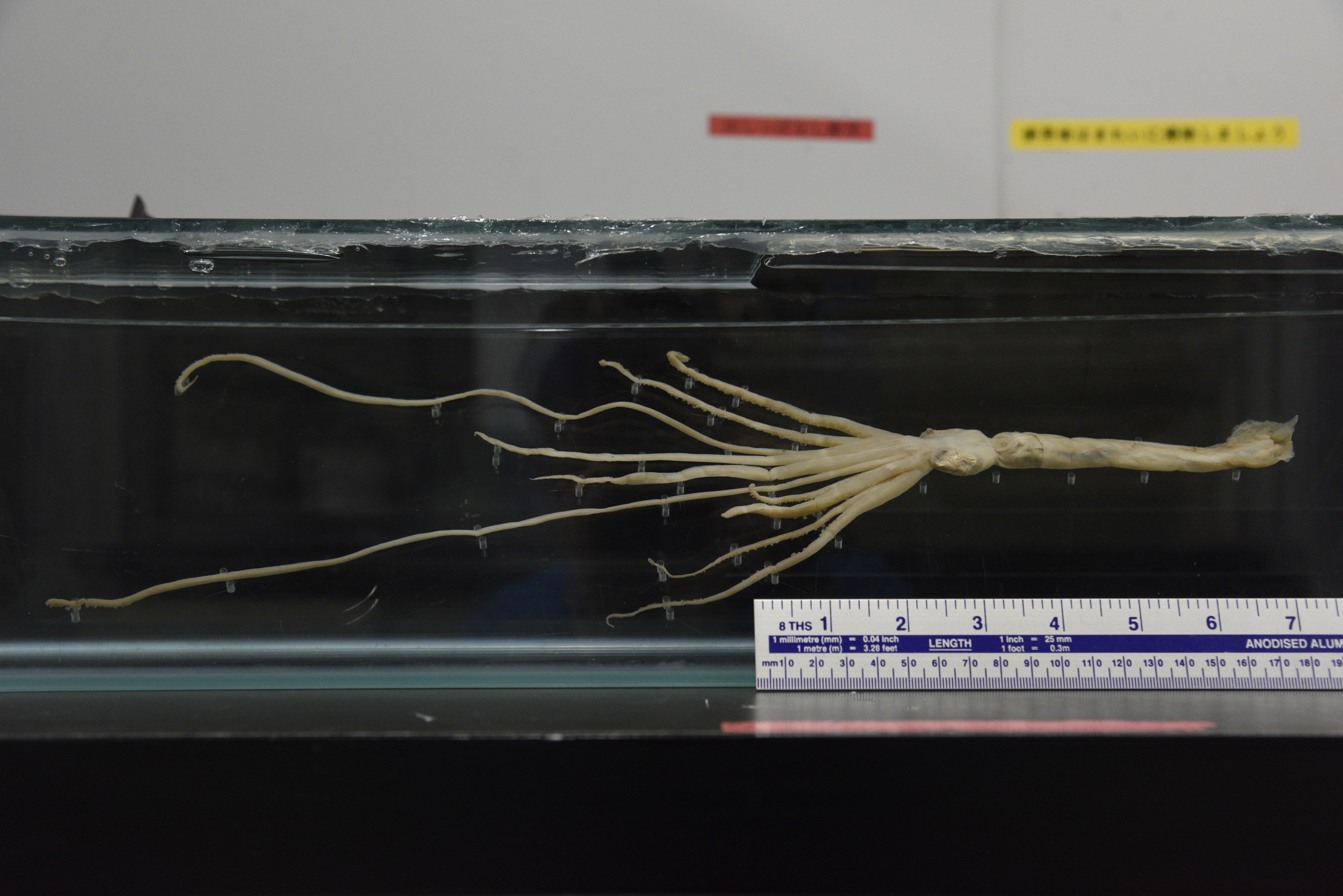
#552 (19 April 2013)
Juvenile giant squid caught off Uchinoura, Kagoshima Prefecture, Japan, on 19 April 2013. Preserved in ethanol at Kagoshima City Aquarium "Io World" (see also closeup).

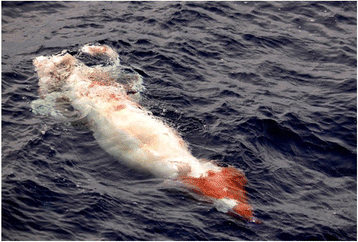
#554 (30 May 2013)
Dead specimen seen from an operating seismic vessel off Brazil

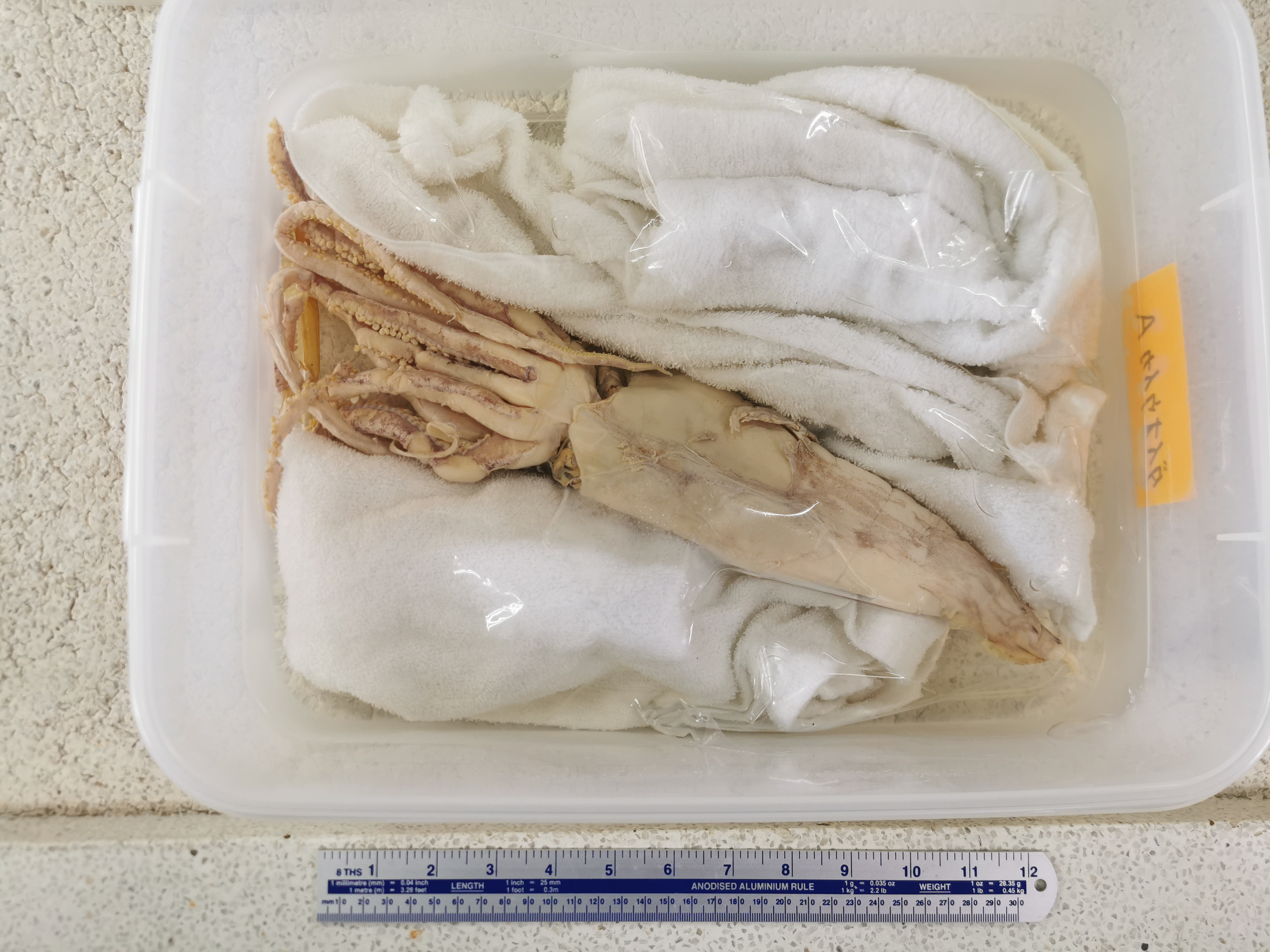
#555 (14 June 2013)
"Specimen A", one of two juvenile giant squid caught off Hamada, Shimane Prefecture, Japan, on 14 June 2013. Preserved in 70% ethanol at Shimane Prefectural Fisheries Technology Center.

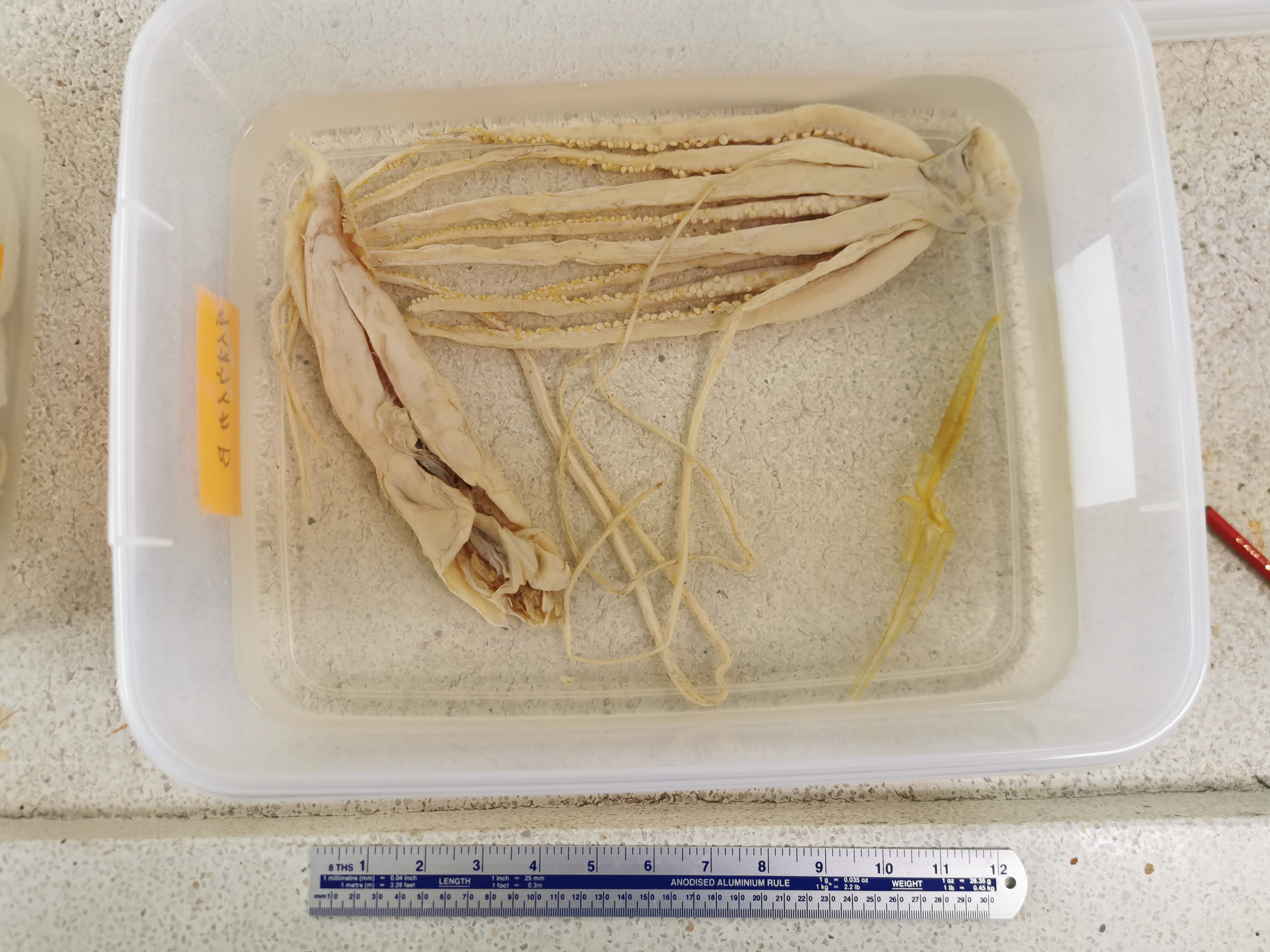
#556 (14 June 2013)
"Specimen B", the second of the two juvenile giant squid collected in the same purse seine net on 14 June 2013, likewise preserved in 70% ethanol at Shimane Prefectural Fisheries Technology Center

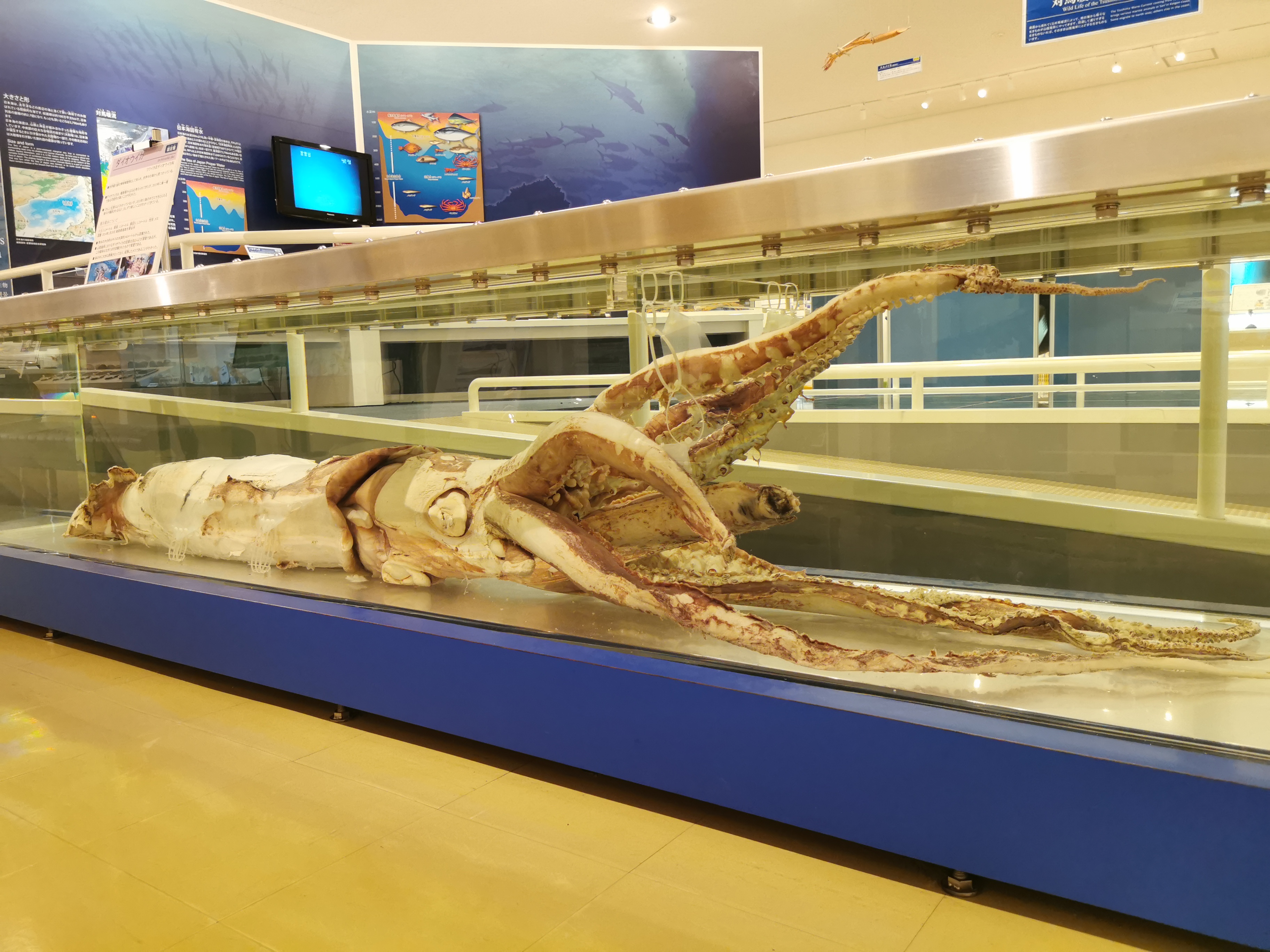
#566 (20 January 2014)
Giant squid caught alive by fishermen off Aoya, Tottori Prefecture, Japan, on 20 January 2014. On display at San'in Kaigan Geopark Museum of the Earth and Sea (next to gladius of #643), preserved in formalin (see also overview of display).

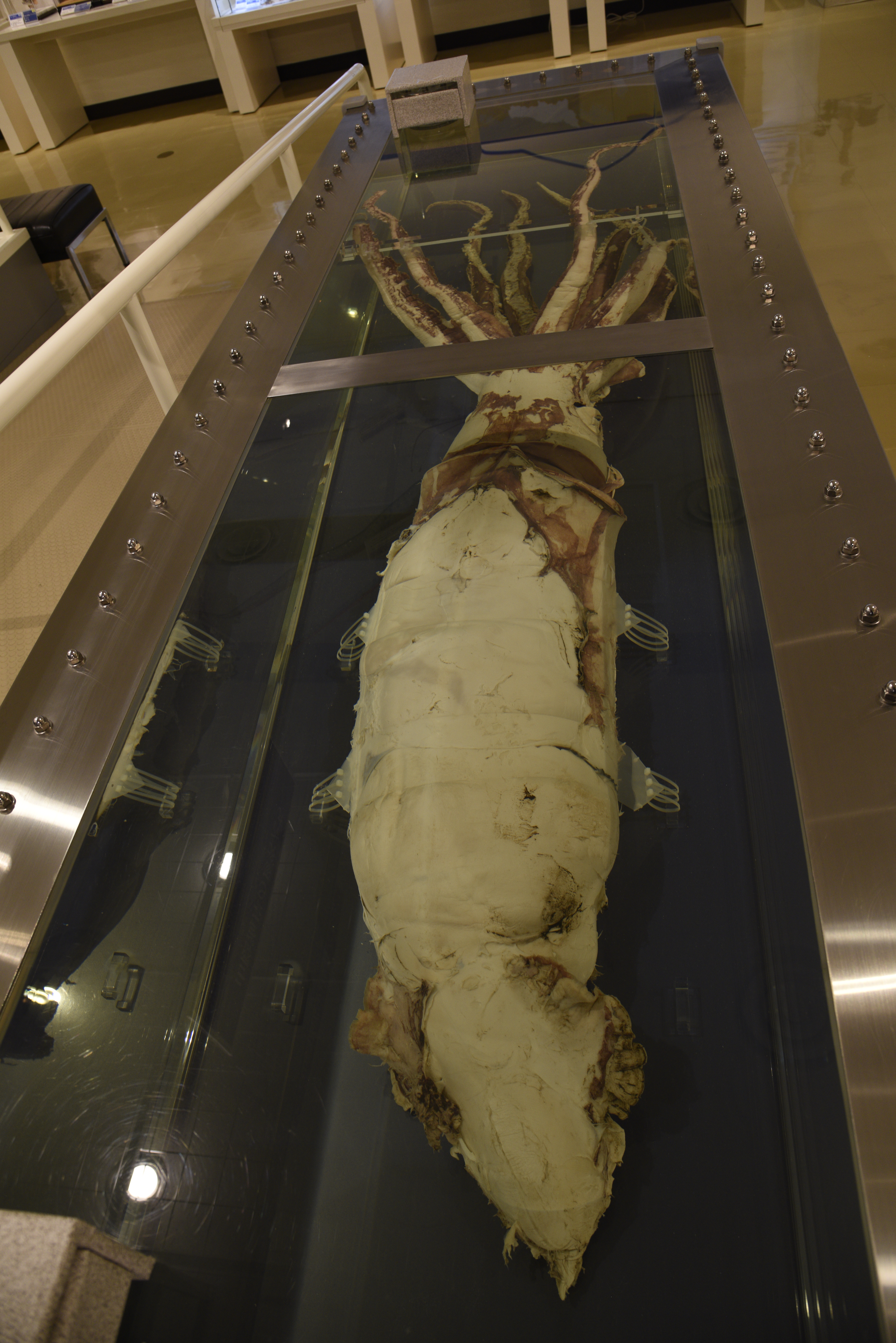
#566 (20 January 2014)
Dorso-posterior view of the same specimen, showing the straps holding the mantle in place (see also dorso-anterior view, oral view, and closeup of head)

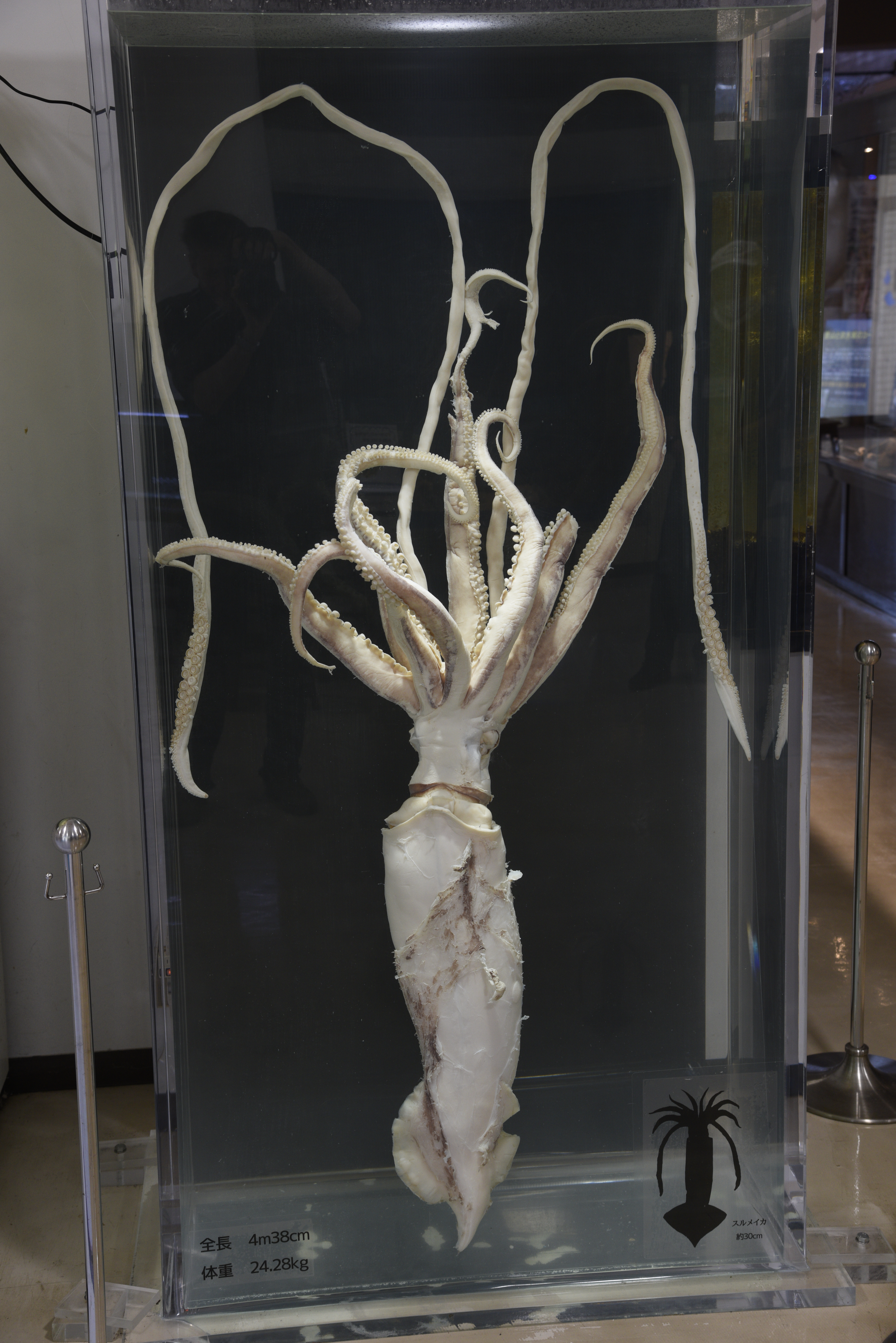
#573 (12/3/2014)
Medium-sized specimen caught alive in Tokyo Bay, Japan, on 12 March 2014. Displayed in formalin at Kannonzaki Nature Museum, Kanagawa Prefecture (see also lateral view and closeup of suckers of tentacle and arm), together with a second, acrylic-embedded specimen (#632).

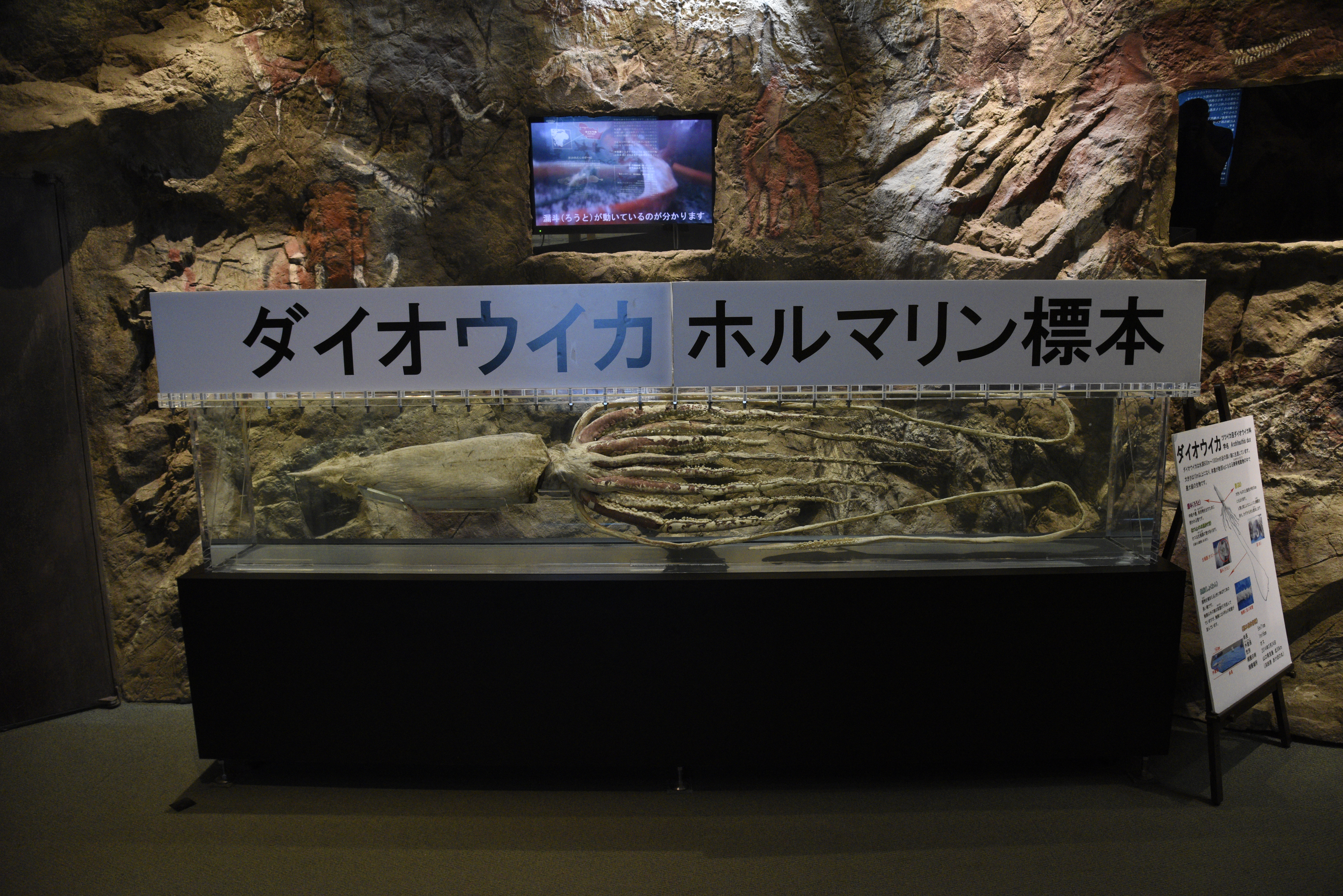
#575 (24 March 2014)
Giant squid caught off Mishima Island, Yamaguchi Prefecture, Japan, on 24 March 2014. Displayed in formalin at Shimane AQUAS Aquarium (see also information board and closeups of head and arms and tentacular club).

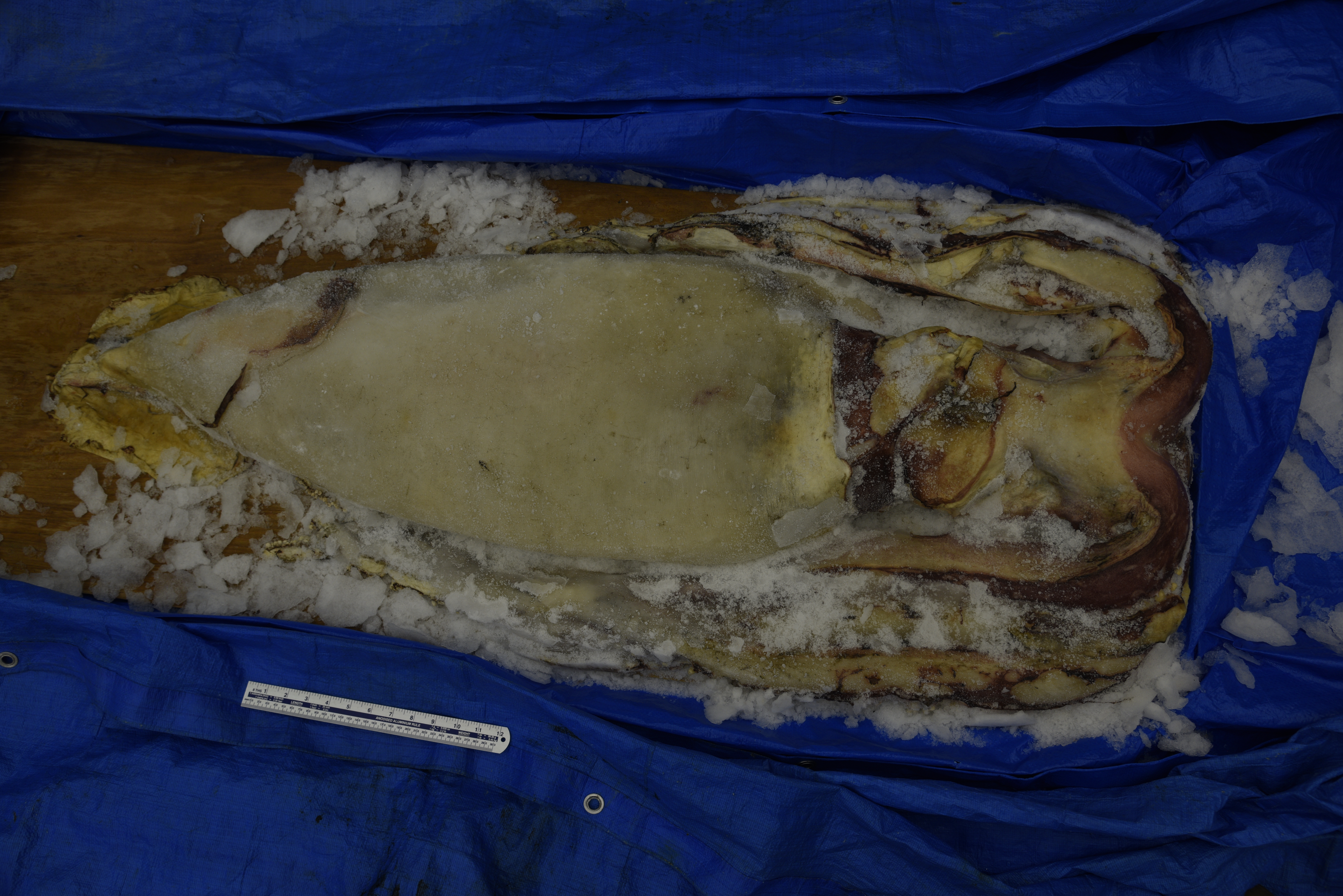
#590 (4/9/2014)
Specimen measuring 140 cm in mantle length caught off Hamada, Shimane Prefecture, Japan, on 4 September 2014. Stored frozen at Shimane AQUAS Aquarium (see also original frozen state and in process of being exposed).

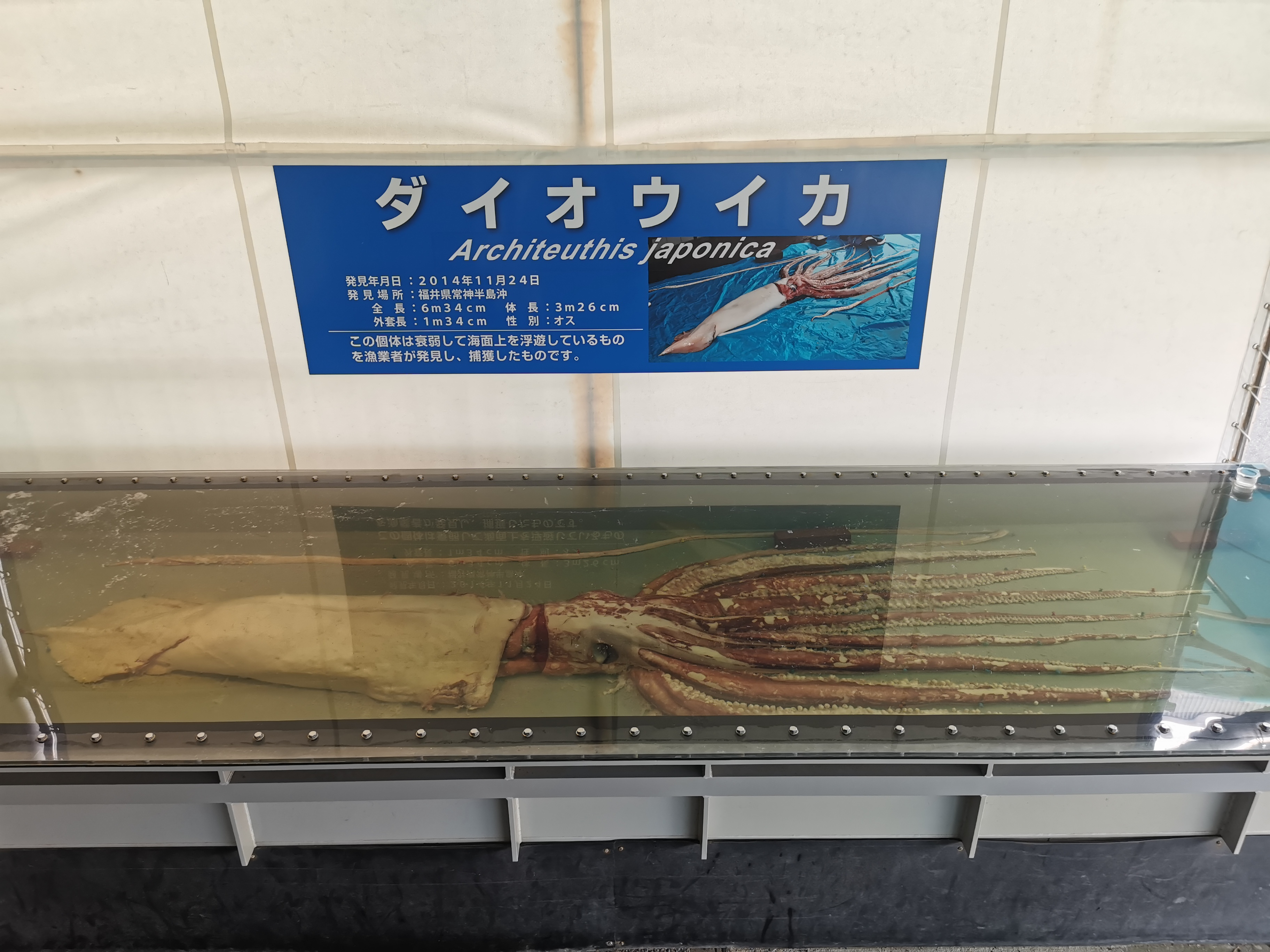
#596 (24 November 2014)
Specimen caught alive at the surface on 24 November 2014 off Wakasa, Fukui Prefecture, Japan. On display at Echizen Matsushima Aquarium, preserved in formalin.

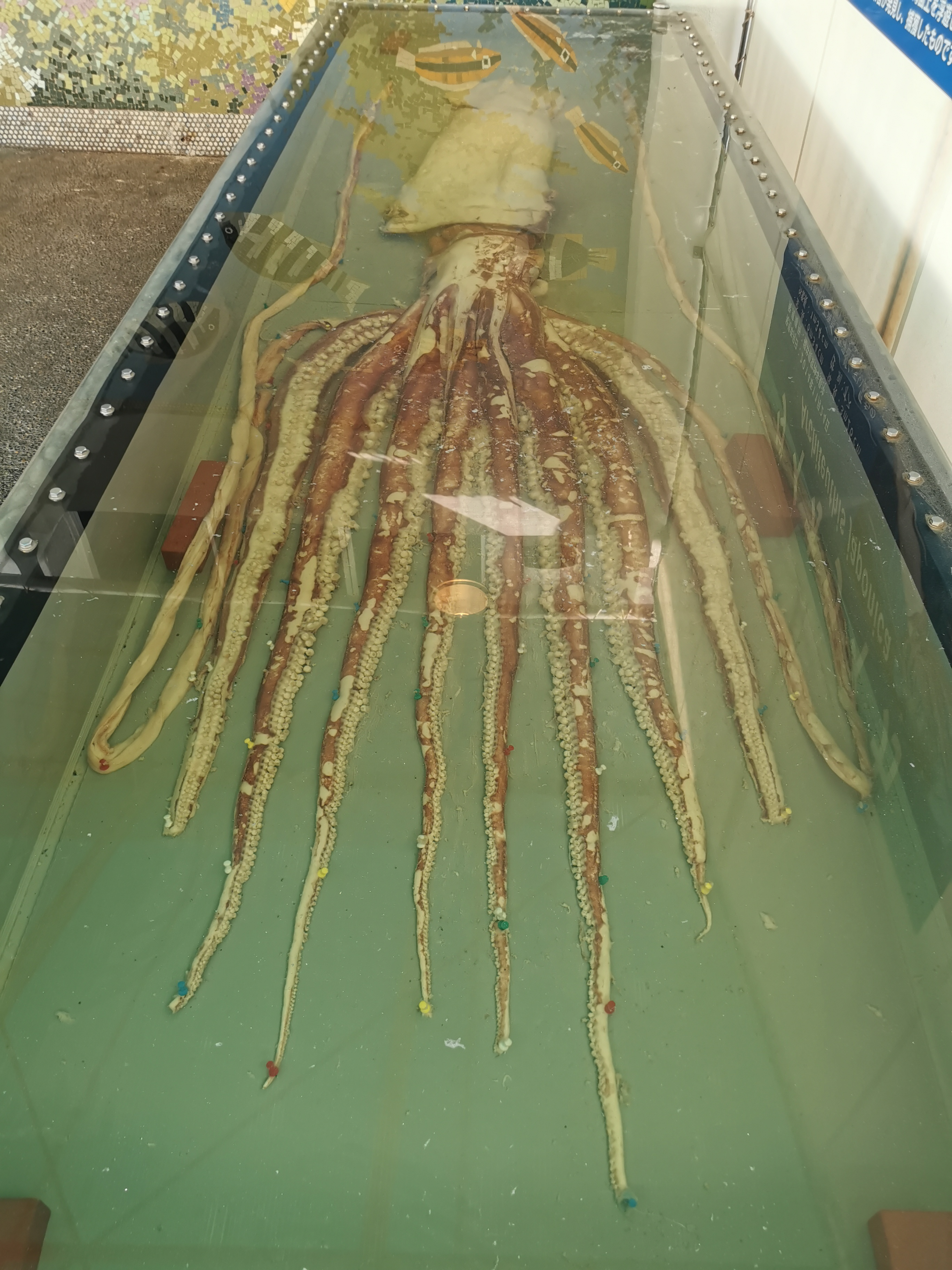
#596 (24 November 2014)
Anterior view of the same specimen, showing well preserved arms and tentacles

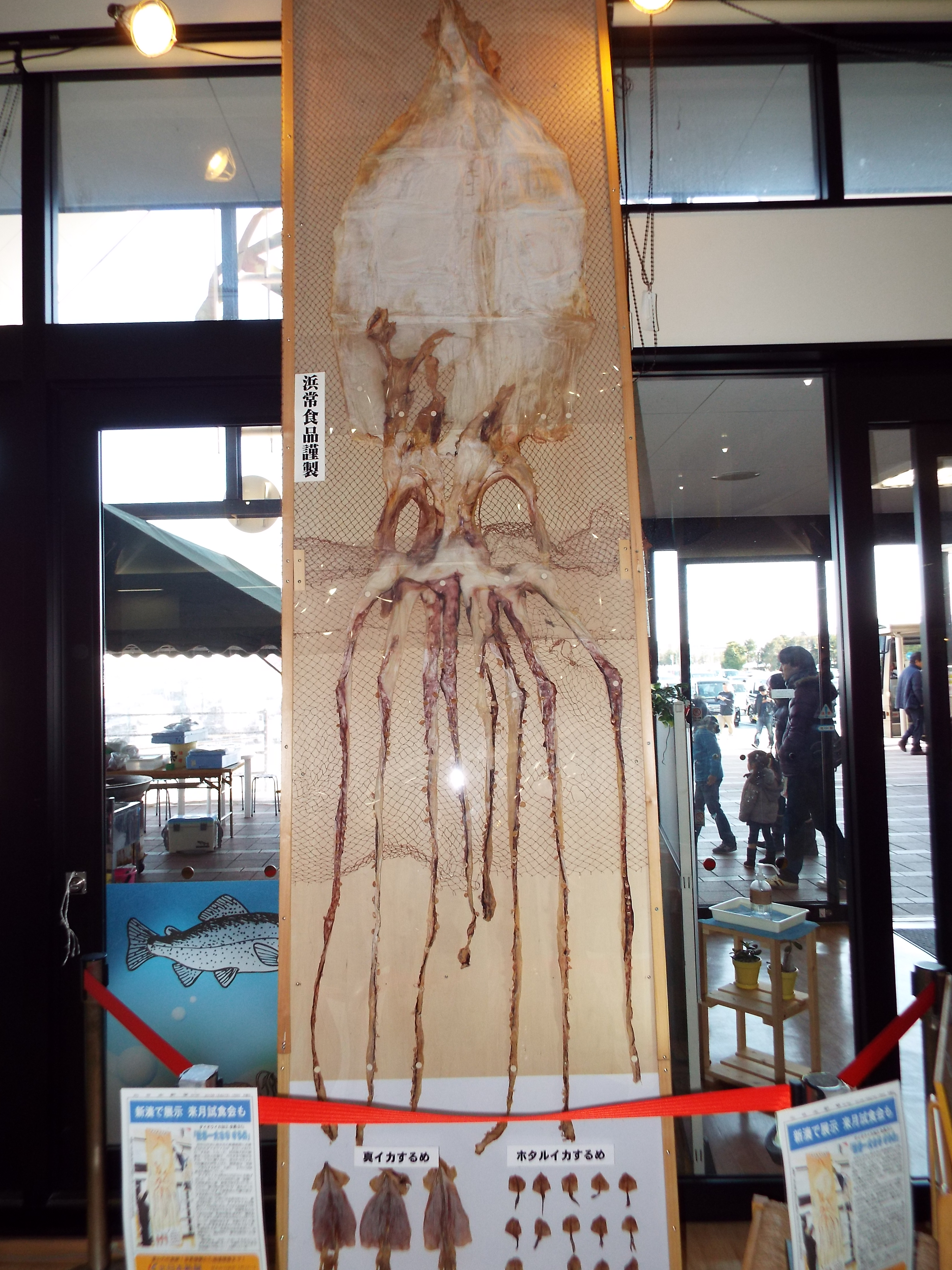
#598 (27 November 2014)
Dried giant squid originally measuring 6.3 m in length

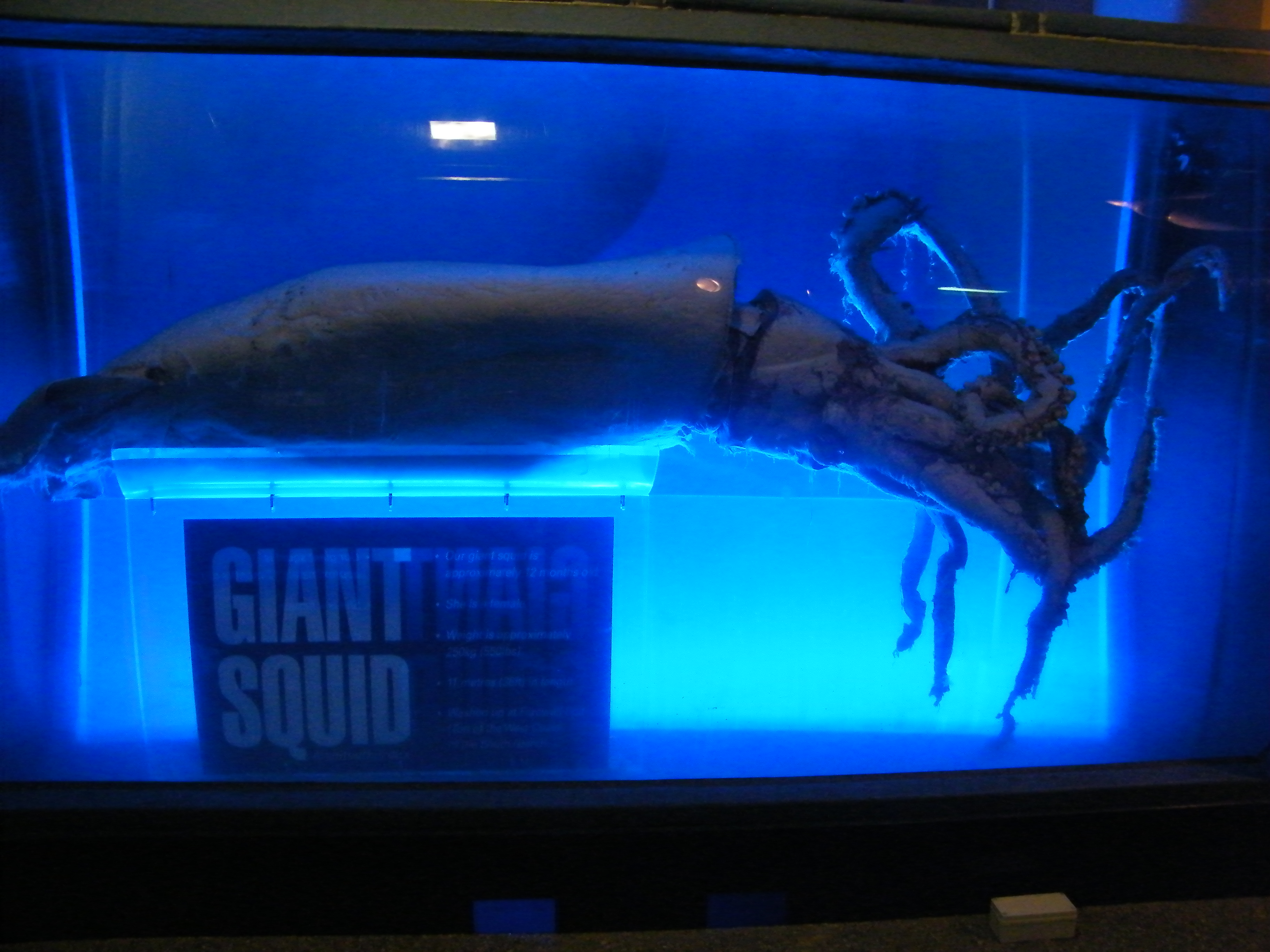
Giant squid display at Kelly Tarlton's Underwater World in Auckland, New Zealand

== Notes ==
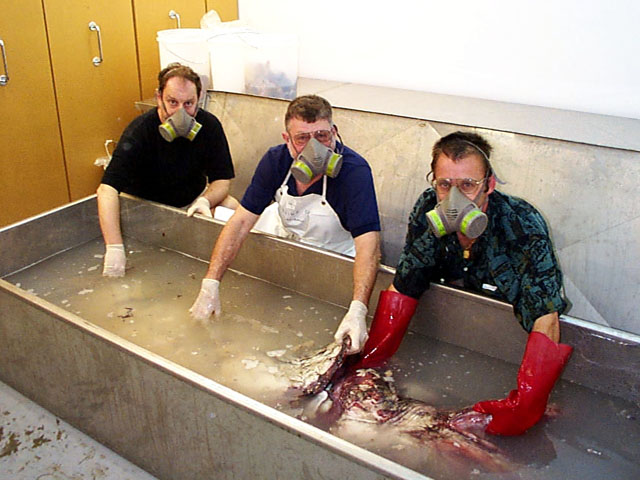
Steve O'Shea (right) and Clyde Roper (centre) preserving a large giant squid in 10% formalin solution on 20 February 1999, during the third and final Smithsonian-backed giant squid expedition
