= List of giant squid specimens and sightings (2015–present) =

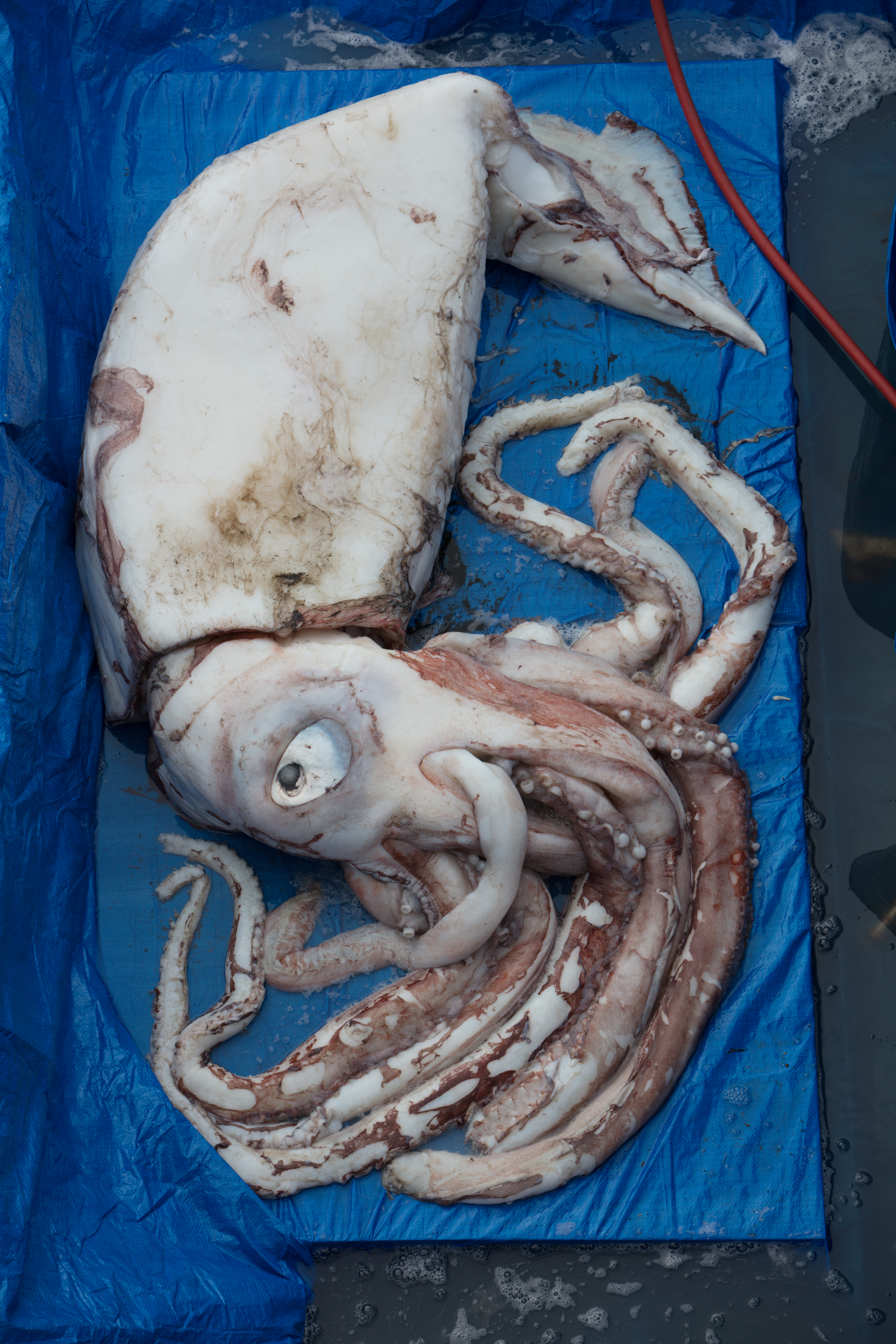
Giant squid caught by hook and line off Greymouth, New Zealand, on 16 August 2018 (#657 on this list). It now forms part of the collections of the Auckland War Memorial Museum.

This list of giant squid specimens and sightings since 2015 is a timeline of recent human encounters with members of the genus Architeuthis, popularly known as giant squid. It includes animals that were caught by fishermen, found washed ashore, recovered (in whole or in part) from sperm whales and other predatory species, as well as those reliably sighted at sea. The list also covers specimens incorrectly assigned to the genus Architeuthis in original descriptions or later publications.

== Background ==
Compilation of published coordinates for specimens since 2015 (some may be subject to significant rounding error and even indicate inland locations) Download coordinates as: KML

The 15-month period between January 2014 and March 2015 saw an unprecedented mass appearance event in the Sea of Japan, during which 57 giant squid specimens were recorded in Japanese coastal waters (spanning #563 to 631) and a substantial but smaller number from the South Korean side. The dramatic increase in strandings during this time has been attributed to unusually low sea temperatures. Nevertheless, specimens often go unreported by Japanese fishermen as their largely inedible flesh means they have a low market value.

Though the frequency with which specimens are observed has increased in recent decades, the giant squid remains a highly elusive animal, especially given its large size and worldwide distribution. Specimen records continue to be compiled and tallied by workers in the field, both regionally and on a global level, with individual specimens regularly receiving scholarly papers unto themselves. As Roper et al. (2015:83) wrote: "Few events in the natural world stimulate more excitement and curiosity among scientists and laymen alike than the discovery of a specimen of Architeuthis."

== List of giant squid ==
Misidentification (non-architeuthid) Record encompassing multiple specimens Photographed or filmed while alive

| # | Date | Location | Nature of encounter | Identification | Material cited | Material saved | Sex | Size and measurements | Repository | Main references | Additional references | Notes |
|---|---|---|---|---|---|---|---|---|---|---|---|---|
| 607 (📷) | 2 January 2015 | Heunghwan-ri, Donghae-myeon, Nam-gu, Pohang, North Gyeongsang Province, South Korea {NWP} | Found washed ashore, dead | "giant squid" | Entire | None | | ?WL: 3.7 m; ?BC: 1.13 m; WT: ~100 kg | | S.-D. Kim (2015); Shin (2015); J.M. Kim (2015) | Nam (2015); K.-T. Kim (2020) | Found washed ashore around 1 pm by Chang-ho Kang and pulled onto beach with help of three local residents and there filmed. Reported to Pohang Coast Guard who announced they would dispose of specimen as waste the following day. |
| 608 (📷) | 5 January 2015 | 2 km east of Ilsan Port, Dong-gu, Ulsan, South Korea {NWP} | Caught in gill net, alive | "giant squid" | Entire, tentacle(s) intact | Not stated | | EL: 8 m; BL: 2 m; ?MW: 45 cm; ?BC: 1.10 m; TL: 6 m | | Heo (2015); Nam (2015); J. Lee (2015) | | Caught at 9 am by small fishing boat Jinyang (1.94 tons) captained by Mr. Lee. Sold to restaurant for 210,000 won (equivalent to US$186 in 2025) through auction at Ulsan Wholesale Agricultural and Fish Market. |
| 609 (📷) | 6 January 2015 | Oobaneo beach, Iwami, Tottori Prefecture, Japan (35.36°N 134.2°E) {NWP} | Found stranded on beach, dead | Architeuthis dux | Entire; tentacles missing | Parts of arm, eye, and mouthparts | Female | DML: 180.5 cm; WL: 355 cm | Tottori Prefectural Museum catalog nos. TRPM-AMo0001224–0001226 (arm, eye, and mouthparts) [specimen B-13 of Kubodera et al. (2016)] | Kubodera et al. (2016, 1 fig. in supplementary material); Ichisawa et al. (2018:10, 11, 15, fig. 4d) | | Discovered by local people and reported by Y. Kiyosue of Notojima Seaside Park, who photographed it as found. Arms, right eye and mouthparts stored as plastinated specimens at Tottori Prefectural Museum. |
| 610 | 13 January 2015 | south of Tsubakiyama, Henashi, Fukaura-machi, Aomori Prefecture, Japan (40.35°N 139.51°E) {NWP} | Found stranded on beach, dead | Architeuthis dux | Entire; tentacles missing | | Male | DML: 127 cm | [specimen B-14 of Kubodera et al. (2016)] | Kubodera et al. (2016, 2 figs. in supplementary material) | | Found by fisherman and reported by E. Koganezaki of the Ajigasawa Fisheries Office, who photographed it as found and dissected in situ. Specimen had empty stomach. |
| 611 | 15 January 2015 | 500 m off Iino, Nyuzen-cho, Toyama Prefecture, Japan (36.56°N 137.25°E) at 50–60 m depth {NWP} | Caught in fixed net for amberjack | Architeuthis dux | Entire; tentacles missing | | | WL: 420 cm | [specimen B-15 of Kubodera et al. (2016)] | Kubodera et al. (2016) | | Found by fisherman and reported by M. Kanbayashi of Kitanihon Broadcasting. |
| 612 | 19 January 2015 | 2 km off Shinminato, Hachiman-machi, Imizu-shi, Toyama Prefecture, Japan (36.47°N 137.06°E) at 60 m depth {NWP} | Caught in fixed net, alive | Architeuthis dux | Entire | | | DML: ~200 cm; EL: ~600 cm; WT: ~200 kg | [specimen B-16 of Kubodera et al. (2016)] | Kubodera et al. (2016) | The Toyama Shimbun, 20 January 2015 | Found by fisherman. Exhibited at Michinoeki Shinminato. |
| 613 (📷) | 19 January 2015 | 2 km off Yokata fishing port, Toyama-shi, Toyama Prefecture, Japan (36.46°N 137.11°E) at 90 m depth {NWP} | Caught in fixed net; filmed alive in water by divers | Architeuthis dux | Entire | | | WL: ~300 cm | [specimen B-17 of Kubodera et al. (2016)] | [Anon.] (2015c); Kubodera et al. (2016) | Fuji News Network report, 19 January 2015 | Found by fisherman. Video footage recorded. |
| 614 (📷) | 22 January 2015 | 2 km off Iwase, Toyama-shi, Toyama Prefecture, Japan (36.47°N 137.14°E) {NWP} | Caught in fixed net for amberjack, filmed and photographed alive | Architeuthis dux | Entire; tentacle(s) present | | | DML: ~200 cm; EL: ~600 cm; ?WL: ~3 m | [specimen B-18 of Kubodera et al. (2016)] | [Anon.] (2015a); [Anon.] (2015b); Kubodera et al. (2016) | The Kitanippon Shimbun, 23 January 2015 | Found alive in stationary net around 3:30 am; caught with school of Japanese common squid (Todarodes pacificus). Filmed and photographed alive in net. Died shortly after being pulled onto ship. Landed at Iwase port and there measured. |
| 615 (📷) | 24 January 2015 (reported) | off Daitō Islands, Okinawa Prefecture, Japan {NWP} | Filmed alive at surface | giant squid (Note: Referred to by the Japanese equivalent "ダイオウイカ" (daiōika) or "大王イカ" (daiōika).) | Entire, good condition; red skin somewhat damaged | | | None given | | Uchima (2015) | | Filmed grasping Thysanoteuthis rhombus caught on fishing lure; seen inking after releasing prey. |
| 616 | 29 January 2015 | off Shinminato, Hachiman-machi, Imizu-shi, Toyama Prefecture, Japan (36.47°N 137.07°E) {NWP} | Caught in fixed net, alive | Architeuthis dux | Entire; tentacles missing | | | DML: 170 cm; WL: ~400 cm | [specimen B-19 of Kubodera et al. (2016)] | Kubodera et al. (2016) | The Kitanippon Shimbun, 30 January 2015 | Found by fisherman. Specimen B-20 was found nearby on the same day. |
| 617 | 29 January 2015 | off Shinminato, Hachiman-machi, Imizu-shi, Toyama Prefecture, Japan (36.47°N 137.07°E) {NWP} | Caught in fixed net, alive | Architeuthis dux | Entire | Entire | | ML: 180 cm; EL: 6.3 m; WT: 150 kg | [specimen B-20 of Kubodera et al. (2016)] | Kubodera et al. (2016) | The Kitanippon Shimbun, 30 January 2015; Shimada et al. (2017:9) | On public display. Found by fisherman. Specimen B-19 was found nearby on the same day. Exhibited in dry state at local fish market from February 2015. |
| 618 (📷) | 3 February 2015 (morning) | 2 km off Yokata fishing port, Toyama-shi, Toyama Prefecture, Japan (36.46°N 137.11°E) at 78.4 m depth {NWP} | Caught in fixed net; filmed alive in water by two divers; swam away slowly once released | Architeuthis dux | Entire; tentacles missing, red skin somewhat damaged | None | | DML: ~200 cm; WL: ~400 cm | None [specimen B-21 of Kubodera et al. (2016)] | [Anon.] (2015d); Kubodera et al. (2016) | Fuji News Network report, 4 February 2015; Wakabayashi (2016); Matsumoto (2019a, fig.) | Found by fisherman. Video footage recorded; seen inking. Featured in Japanese documentary. |
| 619 | 4 February 2015 | 1 km off Aoshima, Uozu-shi, Toyama Prefecture, Japan (36.5°N 137.23°E) {NWP} | Caught in fixed net | Architeuthis dux | Entire | | | WL: ~400 cm | [specimen B-22 of Kubodera et al. (2016)] | Kubodera et al. (2016) | Toyama Television report, 4 February 2015 | Found by fisherman. |
| 620 | 6 February 2015 | 500 m off Kodomari, Misakimachi, Suzu-shi, Ishikawa Prefecture, Japan (37.26°N 137.22°E) at 40 m depth {NWP} | Caught in fixed net, alive; released | Architeuthis dux | Entire | | | WL: 335 cm | [specimen B-23 of Kubodera et al. (2016)] | Kubodera et al. (2016) | The Hokkoku Shimbun, 6 February 2015 | Found by fisherman. |
| 621 | 7 February 2015 | 2 km off Iorimachi, Nanao-shi, Ishikawa Prefecture, Japan (37.02°N 137.04°E) {NWP} | Caught in fixed net, alive | Architeuthis dux | Entire; tentacles missing | | | WL: 420 cm; WT: ~200 kg | [specimen B-24 of Kubodera et al. (2016)] | Kubodera et al. (2016) | The Yomiuri Shimbun, 8 February 2015 | Found by fisherman. Exhibited at Notojima Seaside Park. |
| 622 | 7 February 2015 | 2 km off Shichimi, Noto-cho, Ishikawa Prefecture, Japan (37.15°N 137.07°E) {NWP} | Caught in fixed net, alive | Architeuthis dux | Entire; tentacles missing | | | WL: 360 cm; WT: ~150 kg | [specimen B-25 of Kubodera et al. (2016)] | Kubodera et al. (2016) | The Yomiuri Shimbun, 8 February 2015 | Found by fisherman. Exhibited at Notojima Seaside Park. |
| 623 | 16 February 2015 | 1.5 km off Shirouse, Sado Island, Niigata Prefecture, Japan (38.07°N 138.28°E) {NWP} | Caught in fixed net, alive | Architeuthis dux | Entire; tentacles missing | | | WL: 415 cm | [specimen B-26 of Kubodera et al. (2016)] | Kubodera et al. (2016) | The Niigata Nippo, 16 February 2015 | Found by fisherman. Exhibited at a local supermarket. |
| 624 (📷) | 17 February 2015 | Gunkan rock, Gumizaki-cho, Fukui-shi, Fukui Prefecture, Japan (36.02°N 136°E) {NWP} | Found stranded at rock reef, dead | Architeuthis dux | Entire; tentacles missing | None | Female | DML: 175 cm; WL: 377 cm | None [specimen B-27 of Kubodera et al. (2016)] | Kubodera et al. (2016, 2 figs. in supplementary material); [Echizen] (N.d.) | | Found by local people and reported by S. Sasai of Echizen Matsushima Aquarium, who photographed specimen. Dissected and then discarded. |
| 625 | 18 February 2015 | Tsunoshima, Toyokita-cho, Shimonoseki-shi, Yamaguchi Prefecture, Japan (34.21°N 130.51°E) {NWP} | Found stranded at rock reef, dead | Architeuthis dux | Entire; tentacles missing | | | WL: 286 cm; WT: 65.5 kg | [specimen B-28 of Kubodera et al. (2016)] | Kubodera et al. (2016) | The Yamaguchi Shimbun, 19 February 2015 | Found by a tourist. Exhibited at Shimonoseki Kaikyokan aquarium during the summer holidays. |
| 626 (📷) | 23 February 2015 (morning) | ferry pier Koshinokata-machi, Imizushi, Toyama Prefecture, Japan (36.46°N 137.06°E) at 1 m depth {NWP} | Found floating at surface, photographed alive; swam away | Architeuthis dux | Entire, seemingly in perfect condition; red skin fully intact | None | | WL: 250–300 cm | None [specimen B-29 of Kubodera et al. (2016)] | [Anon.] (2015e); Kubodera et al. (2016) | Tulip Television report, 23 February 2015 | Spotted by harbour official at around 8:50 am. |
| 627 | 1 March 2015 | 1–3 km off Namerikawa-shi, Toyama Prefecture, Japan (36.47°N 137.19°E) {NWP} | Caught in fixed net for firefly squid, alive; disposed of at sea | Architeuthis dux | Entire | None | | DML: ~200 cm | None [specimen B-30 of Kubodera et al. (2016)] | Kubodera et al. (2016) | Toyama Television report, 1 March 2015 | Found by fisherman. |
| 628 (📷) | 1 March 2015 | off Takasu, Hamaju-cho, Fukui-shi, Fukui Prefecture, Japan (36.07°N ?°E) at 200 m depth {NWP} | By bottom trawl, dead | Architeuthis dux | Entire; tentacles missing | | Female | DML: 177 cm; WL: 376 cm | [specimen B-31 of Kubodera et al. (2016)] | Kubodera et al. (2016); [Echizen] (N.d.) | | Found by fisherman and reported by S. Sasai of Echizen Matsushima Aquarium. Specimen had empty stomach. Displayed at local roadside station before being collected by aquarium. |
| 629 | 10 March 2015 | Osaki beach, Nishiyama-cho, Kashiwazaki-shi, Niigata Prefecture, Japan (37.29°N 138.38°E) {NWP} | Found stranded on beach, dead | Architeuthis dux | Entire; tentacles missing | | | DML: 161 cm; WL: 327 cm | [specimen B-32 of Kubodera et al. (2016)] | Kubodera et al. (2016, 1 fig. in supplementary material) | | Found by local people. Reported and photographed by K. Minowa of Kashiwazaki City Museum. |
| 630 (📷) | 25 March 2015 (reported) | off Okinoerabujima, Kagoshima Prefecture, Japan {NWP} | Photographed alive at surface | giant squid | Entire, seemingly in perfect condition; red skin fully intact | | | ?WL: ~5 m [estimate] | | [Anon.] (2015f); [Anon.] (2015g) | | Photographed alive at surface by fisherman Shigeki Yamashita. Pink fishing lure (20 cm long) attracted large Thysanoteuthis rhombus (~1.2 m long, >20 kg), which in turn attracted giant squid. |
| 631 | 26 March 2015 | Yoneyama beach, Kashiwazaki-shi, Niigata Prefecture, Japan (37.18°N 138.25°E) {NWP} | Found stranded on beach, dead | Architeuthis dux | Entire; tentacles missing | None | | DML: 190 cm; WL: 360 cm | None [specimen B-33 of Kubodera et al. (2016)] | Kubodera et al. (2016, 1 fig. in supplementary material) | | Found by local people. Reported and photographed by M. Baba of Joetsu Aquarium Museum. Swept out to sea. |
| 632 (📷) | 6 May 2015 (afternoon) | Tokyo Bay, Otsu fishing port, Yokosuka, Kanagawa Prefecture, Japan {NWP} | Found floating at surface; scooped up with rake net and placed in water tank where photographed alive; died soon afterwards | Architeuthis dux | Entire | Entire | Unknown (juvenile) | EL: 126.4 cm; DML: 29.0 cm; HL+AL: 46.6 cm; FL: 95.0 mm; FW: 69.7 mm; WT: 1.034 kg | Kannonzaki Nature Museum | [Anon.] (2015h); [Keikyu] (2015a); [Keikyu] (2015b); [Anon.] (2021o); [Anon.] (2021p) | Shimada et al. (2017:9) | On public display. Found by fisherman Seiichi Ogawa while catching sea cucumbers. Briefly kept alive in tank. Frozen until examination at National Museum of Nature and Science facility (Tsukuba) on 29 June 2015, when identified as giant squid. Displayed at Keikyu Aburatsubo Marine Park (as was #573) from 29 November 2015; embedded in transparent acrylic block (88 cm × 33 cm × 7.8 cm) and installed on automatic rotating table to allow viewing from all sides. Marine park closed in late September 2021; both specimens transferred to Kannonzaki Nature Museum under curatorial director Kazuhiko Yamada (formerly a keeper at Keikyu Aburatsubo), where displayed from 9 November. Specimen may belong to long arm type or middle arm type; cannot be determined due to juvenile nature. Estimated to be <1 year old. |
| 633 (📷) | 13 May 2015 (morning) | South Bay beach, Kaikōura, New Zealand {SWP} | Found washed ashore | "giant squid" | Entire | Entire | | BL: ~2 m; TL: >5 m; EyD: 19 cm | Kaikoura Marine Centre and Aquarium | Hill (2015) | Numerous media sources | Found by Bruce Bennett at 8:30 am while walking dog. Moved to Kaikoura Marine Centre and Aquarium and stored there in freezer. |
| 634 (📷) | 17 May 2015 | off Wollongong, New South Wales, Australia (34°32′S 151°44′E) {SWP} | Gaffed from surface | Architeuthis dux | Various parts including portion of limbs and mantle; badly damaged | | | None given | AMS catalog no. C.269845 | [AMS] (2015); [OZCAM] (2021) | | Collected by Ryan Field and Ben Allaham. Identified day after capture by Amanda L. Reid of Australian Museum; preserved there in wet state. |
| (📷) | 6 August 2015 (morning) | ~50 miles (80 km) north of Getaria and Zumaia, opposite Lekeitio, Basque Country, Spain {NEA} | By trawl | Architeuthis | Entire | Entire | | WL: <8 m; ?WL: ~4.5 m; WT: >80 kg | CEPESMA (Parque de la Vida, Valdés) | Bolívar (2015); Gómez & Bolívar (2015) | [Anon.] (2015j); Del Gallo (2015) | Caught by fisherman Antonio Do Veriño. Landed in port of Santander where it was auctioned and won by BM supermarkets, which placed it on display at their store on Rubén Darío street, Sardinero, Santander. Later handed over to Instituto Español de Oceanografía, who passed it on to CEPESMA in Luarca. |
| [12] (📷) | last week of September 2015 | off Hawaii {NEP} | Found floating at surface, dead | Architeuthis?; Megalocranchia cf. fisheri (Berry, 1909) | Entire; several limbs missing, bite mark in head | Entire | | ?EL: ≥7 ft (2.1 m); WT: 52.7 lb (23.9 kg) | | [Anon.] (2015i); Mosendz (2015) | | Non-architeuthid. Found and retrieved by fishermen with Kona Sea Adventures: boat captain Cyrus Widhalm, deckhands Manny Billegas II and Ian MacKelvie, and anglers Mathew and Miriam Fowler. Squid had apparently been attacked at sea. Landed in Kailua-Kona. Length estimated by laying alongside 72 in (180 cm) fishing bag. Later placed on ice and sent to Washington state for examination. Tentatively identified as Megalocranchia fisheri by marine biologist. |
| 635 (📷) | 17 November 2015 (reported) | off Hahajima, Ogasawara Islands, Japan {NWP} | Filmed alive at surface | giant squid | Entire; red skin largely intact | | | None given | | Murata (2015) | | Photographed and filmed at surface by Keisuke Murata; seen grasping line-caught swordfish. |
| 636 (📷) | 23 November 2015 (night) | El Cudillo fishing ground (#202 on map), near Cañón de Lastres, Gijón, Asturias, Spain, at 300–400 m depth {NEA} | By trawl | Architeuthis dux | Entire | Entire | Female (immature?) | EL: 10 m; WT: 150 kg | CEPESMA (Parque de la Vida, Valdés) | [Anon.] (2015j); Del Gallo (2015); [Anon.] (2015k); Peláez (2015) | Numerous media sources | Caught by the trawler Minchos VI around 21:30 pm local time, in waters 300 fathoms (550 m) deep. Landed in Muelle del Rendiello, El Musel, Gijón. Frozen in Gijón fish market before being transferred to CEPESMA in Luarca. Planned to be dissected later that year before going on display. |
| 637 (📷) | 24 December 2015 (morning) | Toyama Bay, Mizuhashi Fisherina, Toyama, Toyama Prefecture, Japan {NWP} | Filmed and photographed alive near surface | Architeuthis | Entire, good condition; red skin somewhat damaged | None | | WL: 3.7 m [estimate] | None | [Anon.] (2015l); McKirdy & Ogura (2015); Feltman (2015); Hongo (2015); Keartes (2015); Murai (2015); [Anon.] (2015m); Hunt (2015) | Nippon TV report; ANN News report; Wakabayashi (2016); Cronin (2016); Gallant (2016:46, 96); numerous media sources | High quality video footage recorded. Spotted swimming under docked fishing boats around 7 am. Spent several hours in Toyama Bay harbour where it was filmed by local divers, including Akinobu Kimura, owner of local Diving Shop Kaiyu, and professional underwater cameraman Takayoshi Kojima, who swam alongside it (as did Yuki Igushi, a curator at Uozu Aquarium, who described the powerful action of its suckers upon touching). Also seen by harbourmaster and Mizuhashi Fisherina manager Tatsuya Wakasugi. Kojima and Kimura "helped guide" it out to sea; initially pushed back and forth by fast flowing water near entrance to marina, but eventually disappeared into depths around 2:30 pm. Squid "showed some signs of energy", including inking and attempting to wrap arms around divers. Display with 4.3 m resin giant squid model and Igushi's 8-minute video (and one of #639) opened at Uozu Aquarium on 16 January 2016. Claimed by Gallant (2016:46, 96) as first giant squid to be filmed by a diver (but see #613) and as largest squid observed on a dive (but see #618). |
| 638 (📷) | 26 December 2015 | Seokbyeong-ri, Guryongpo-eup, Nam-gu, Pohang, North Gyeongsang Province, South Korea {NWP} | Found washed ashore, dead | giant squid (Note: Referred to by the Korean equivalent "대왕오징어" (daewangojingeo).) | Entire; tentacles intact | Not stated | | EL: ~6 m | | C.-H. Choi (2015) | | Found washed ashore by fisherman. Information supplied by Pohang Coast Guard. |
| 639 (📷) | 3 January 2016 | Toyama-Shinko Port, Toyama Prefecture, Japan {NWP} | Filmed and photographed alive at surface | giant squid | Entire; red skin largely intact, missing from distal end | | | ?WL: ~2.5–3 m [estimate] | | "yokotama37" (2016); "atelierichi" (2016) | FNN News report, 4 January 2016; [Anon.] (2016b) | Photographed and filmed alive at surface at around 1:30 am; seen by 3 people. Display with 4.3 m resin giant squid model and video of this specimen (and one of #637) opened at Uozu Aquarium on 16 January 2016. |
| 640 (📷) | 7 January 2016 (reported) | Yaetsu Beach, Toyama, Toyama Prefecture, Japan {NWP} | Found washed ashore | giant squid | Entire | | | ?WL: 3 m | | [Anon.] (2016a) | | Found and photographed on beach. Speculated by Osamu Inamura, director of Uozu Aquarium, to have possibly escaped from fixed net prior to stranding. |
| 641 (📷) | 11 January 2016 | near Wushi Port, Yilan, Taiwan, at ~18–20 m depth {NWP} | Caught by fishermen trawling for flathead grey mullet (Mugil cephalus) | Architeuthis dux | Entire; tentacles, eye(s) and some reddish skin intact; portions of arms missing | Entire | Male (mature) | EL: ~4 m; ML: 89 cm [fresh]; ML: 70 cm [after fixation and dehydration]; EyD: 8 cm; WT: 17 kg | National Museum of Natural Science, Taichung, Taiwan | Xiao (2016); Huang et al. (2016); Liu et al. (2017:2); Zhang (2017) | | First specimen from Taiwan. Caught by Hsien-Kun Lin; initial preservation and transportation assisted by Chun-Yen Lin and Yao-Chen Lee. Stored on ice for 6 hours after capture and transported at low temperature (<4 °C) to laboratory at National Chung Hsing University where dissected at <15 °C over 4 hours. Fully developed sperm mass present; small size for mature male. Stomach empty. Fixed in 10% formalin; replaced with 70% ethanol after 10 days. Left optic lobe scanned using high-resolution MRI as part of comparative study of giant squid optic lobe morphology and internal structure. |
| 642 (📷) | 17 January 2016 (morning) | near Noto, Hōsu District, Noto Peninsula, Ishikawa Prefecture, Japan (37°21′12″N 137°15′17″E) {NWP} | Found stranded ashore, alive | Architeuthis dux | Entire; arm tips intact, red skin and tentacles largely missing (stubs only) | Entire, including internal organs and eggs | Female (mature) | ML: 170 cm; WL: 417 cm; BC: 113 cm; FL: 52 cm; AL(IV): 210 cm [longest]; EL: ≥10 m [estimate]; WT: 110–180 kg [estimate] | Ishikawa Prefectural Natural History Museum | Takeda (2016); Shimada et al. (2017:1, figs. 1–5, suppl. figs. 1–24) | | On public display. Found by Mr. Kubota while walking along coast around 8 am. Dissection revealed well developed ovaries with an estimated 1.48 × 10^{7} eggs. Fixed in formalin and placed on display at Ishikawa Prefectural Natural History Museum; eggs stored in 70% ethanol. |
| (📷) | early 2016 (caught "several weeks" before 22 February) | off Bain-Boeuf, northern Mauritius {SIO} | Caught by fishermen | "giant squid" | Entire; eye(s) and skin largely intact, mantle cut open and damaged | | | WT: 125 kg | | [Anon.] (2016f); Touzé (2016) | | Caught by boat Lady Diana, with crew including captain Mikael Bardin, Karl Gentille, and angler Toorabally Adil. Misidentified as a Humboldt squid in some reports. |
| 643 (📷) | 4 February 2016 | Jurokuhonmatsu beach, Tottori-shi, Tottori Prefecture, Japan {NWP} | Found washed ashore, dead | Architeuthis dux | Entire, partly decomposed; eyes and ends of tentacles missing | Mouthparts and gladius | Female | DML: 162 cm; WL: 318 cm | San'in Kaigan Geopark Museum of the Earth and Sea | Ichisawa et al. (2018:10, 11, 15, fig. 4e) | | On public display. Mouthparts and gladius kept at San'in Kaigan Geopark Museum of the Earth and Sea; gladius exhibited next to whole specimen (#566). |
| 644 (📷) | 6 February 2016 (early morning) | 100 m off coast of Ine Bay, Kyoto Prefecture, Japan {NWP} | Photographed alive in fixed net; escaped | giant squid | Entire, seemingly in perfect condition; red skin fully intact | None | | ?WL: 4 m | None | [Anon.] (2016d) | | Caught by fisherman Shirasu Shu-Ichiro. Photographed by Katsuyoshi Nagashima. |
| 645 (📷) | 8 February 2016 | off Imizu, Toyama Prefecture, Japan {NWP} | Caught | giant squid | Entire, good condition; eye(s) and most of red skin intact | | | ?WL: ~5 m | | [Anon.] (2016c) | | |
| 646 (📷) | 13 February 2016 | Kosagawa, Kisakata-machi, Nikaho-shi, Akita Prefecture, Japan {NWP} | Found washed ashore | giant squid | Entire; tentacles missing | Entire (including separated part) | | ML: 136 cm; WL: 3.22 m; WT: 114/70 kg | Akita Prefectural Museum | [Anon.] (2016e); Funaki (2017:3) | Shimada et al. (2017:9) | On public display. Exhibited at Akita Prefectural Museum from 1 April 2016, preserved in formalin and ethanol. Previously temporarily displayed at Oga Aquarium GAO, who collected it on 14 February. |
| 647 (📷) | 4 March 2016 | 5–6 nmi (9.3–11.1 km) off Saint Gilles, Reunion Island (21°03′S 55°08′E; coordinates estimated from eyewitness statements) {SIO} | Found floating at surface, dead | Architeuthis dux Steenstrup, 1857 | Entire; missing distal part of mantle including fins | Head with limbs | | LRL: 19.74 mm; DML: 2153–3060 mm [estimated from LRL]; EL: 7262–15,664 mm [estimated from DML] | University of Reunion Island | Romanov et al. (2018); Romanov (2018) | | Found by crew of game fishing vessel FV Maeva 4, including captain Loïc Jauneau and deckhand Joel Mussard. Photographed by Thibaut Thellier during and after retrieval. Whole carcass too heavy to bring aboard; only head and limbs saved. Possibly largest recorded giant squid specimen, based on estimated mantle and total lengths. Soon after the paper of Romanov et al. (2018) was published the authors received reports of recent giant squid off the Maldives and Seychelles. |
| (📷) | 19 May 2016 (reported) | Bremer Canyon region, Western Australia, Australia {SWP} | Found floating at surface, dead | Architeuthis dux (most likely) | Three specimens; two entire with some damage, one partial brachial crown with beak | Beak and tissue samples | | None given | | [CETREC WA] (2016) | | Found during last of summer 2016 field trips of Cetacean Research Centre (CETREC WA). Filmed at surface and during retrieval. Appeared freshly dead. Beak and tissue samples collected by marine ecologist Bob Pitman for species confirmation; rest scavenged by gulls. Discovery of remains of various squid species following killer whale feeding events suggests "strong dependence on squid for at least some of the killer whales and most likely several of the other toothed whale species abundant in the region". Other putative giant squid remains have been reported from Bremer Canyon and a giant squid was reportedly seen at the surface there being chased by killer whales in February 2021. |
| 648 (📷) | 7 October 2016 (morning) | O Vicedo–O Barqueiro estuary at ~3 m depth (sighting of live animal) and Playa de O Coidón (stranding), Bares peninsula, Galicia, Spain (43°46.17′N 7°40.25′W) {NEA} | Photographed alive in water; 2.5 hours later found stranded on beach, dead | Architeuthis dux | Entire, "very fresh"; tentacles severed at base, mantle covered with sucker marks and scars, gills and one eye damaged, other eye intact | Entire | Female (immature) | DML: 123 cm;? WL: 3.2 m; EL: >6 m [estimate; if intact]; WT: 105 kg | CEPESMA (Parque de la Vida, Valdés) | Gayoso (2016); Romar (2016); Keartes (2016); Guerra et al. (2018:755, figs. 1–2); [Anon.] (2018a); [Anon.] (2018b); Preston (2018) | Guerra, 2022; numerous media sources | First live adult photographed outside Japanese waters. Photographed in shallow water at 11 am by Javier Ondicol of León, who observed repeated colour change apparently in response to his presence. Also filmed in process of washing ashore, dead. Necropsy at CEPESMA's Parque de la Vida near Luarca one week after discovery revealed no signs of mating, no food remains in digestive tract, and no traces of macroscopic parasites; believed to have been wounded in encounter with conspecific, possibly involving kleptoparasitism (second record involving such aggressive intraspecific behaviour after #559). Probably rose to surface very slowly based on intact eye. mtDNA analysis confirmed species as A. dux. |
| 649 (📷) | 21 December 2016 (morning) | off Toyama, Toyama Prefecture, Japan {NWP} | Caught in fixed net | giant squid | Entire, good condition; red skin partly missing | | | ?WL: ~4 m | | [Anon.] (2016g) | | Caught around 11:20 am. Landed at Mizuhashi fishing port in Toyama. |
| 650 (📷) | March 2017 | near Melkbosstrand, South Africa {SEA} | Found floating at surface, alive; filmed wrapping itself around paddleboard; snared with rope and dragged to shore | Architeuthis | Entire, badly injured; covered with (seal?) bite marks, missing several arm tips and patches of skin | | Male (mature) | None given | | Keartes (2017b); Grundhauser (2017); Payne (2017) | | Found by paddleboarder James Taylor, who secured it with rope; when pulled, animal lethargically wrapped its arms around his board. Pulled to shore to save it "for research purposes". Once on beach, head severed by Taylor to "put it out of its misery", after which animal was seen releasing spermatophores, confirming sex as male. Whole incident captured on video, with further video and photos taken on beach. Researchers reached beached specimen several days later and salvaged some remains. Identified as giant squid by teuthologist Michael Vecchione based on footage (which was posted online by Taylor and went viral). Poor state of animal might indicate post-spawning individual. |
| 651 (📷) | 15 May 2017 | near Porcupine Basin, 190 km off Dingle, County Kerry, Ireland {NEA} | By trawl | Architeuthis dux | Entire; tentacles intact | Entire | Male (juvenile) | EL: 5.8 m [also misreported as 15.8 m] | NMI | O'Sullivan (2017); [Anon.] (2017a); [Anon.] (2017b); Flannery (2017); Keartes (2017a); O'Sullivan & Hamilton (2017) | Numerous media sources | Caught by crew of Cú na Mara, skippered by Pete Flannery, while trawling for prawns. Flannery's father caught two giant squid in the same area in 1995 (#354 and 355). First taken to Dingle Oceanworld in Dingle, where it was dissected by marine biologist Kevin Flannery and studied by marine science students from Sacred Heart University, Connecticut, then transferred to the National Museum of Ireland – Natural History in Dublin. |
| 652 (📷) | 18 July 2017 | Porcupine Bank, off Dingle, County Kerry, Ireland {NEA} | By trawl | Architeuthis dux | Entire, good condition; tentacles and eye(s) intact | Entire | | EL: 5.5 m | Dingle Oceanworld | Lucey (2017); [Anon.] (2017c) | Numerous media sources | Caught by crew of Cú na Mara, skippered by Pete Flannery, while trawling for prawns. Flannery's father caught two giant squid in the same area in 1995 (#354 and 355). Studied by marine biologist Kevin Flannery. In "better condition" than specimen from 15 May 2017. |
| 653 (📷) | 28 August 2017 (morning) | Guano Bay, near Lüderitz, Namibia {SEA} | Found stranded on beach | Architeuthis cf. sanctipauli | Entire, "fresh [...] no visible injuries or obvious signs of illness"; tentacles, arm tips and skin missing | Beak | Female (mature) | ML: 189 cm; WL: 401 cm [arm tips missing]; EL: 8–9 m [estimate] | | [Anon.] (2017d); Finck (2017); Kemper (2017:1) | | Measurements taken on morning of discovery, when all arm tips were already missing. Kelp gulls seen feeding on remains and had shortened arms by a further 30 cm by next morning, when beach post mortem established sex as female. Beak extracted and kept refrigerated in ethanol. Reported by marine scientist Jean-Paul Roux from the Ministry of Fisheries and Marine Resources, who was stationed with Lüderitz Marine Research. Examined and photographed by Roux and Jessica Kemper. Seen by kite surfers preparing for 2017 Lüderitz Speed Challenge. |
| (📷) | 29 August 2017 | off Playa de El Sablón, Posada Herrera, Llanes, Asturias, Spain {NEA} | Found floating at surface, dead; pulled to shore | Architeuthis | Entire; eye(s) and tentacle(s) intact | Entire | Male | ML: <1 m; BL+HL: ~1.4 m; EL: almost 6 m; WT: 63 kg | General Directorate of Fisheries | [Llanes] (2017); [Anon.] (2017e); Castro (2017a); Castro (2017b); Cea (2017); [AVA-Q] (2017); [Anon.] (2018e) | | Found floating at surface around 10 am or noon; pulled onto beach by bathers who poured water over specimen to delay decomposition; attracted large crowd. Red Cross lifeguards initially gave notice through 112 emergency number and contacted CEPESMA. Verified as dead by councillor for the environment Juan Carlos Armas. Taken custody of by General Directorate of Fisheries and transferred to cold room of Llanes Fishermen's Guild; lack of coordination with CEPESMA (who arrived hoping to collect specimen) criticised by group's director Luis Laria and by Greens Equo party of Asturias. Necropsied by scientists on 26 June 2018; to be preserved in alcohol for display in museum of Centro de Experimentación Pesquera. |
| (📷) | 28 September 2017 | near estuary mouth, Playa de O Torno, San Cibrao (San Ciprián), Cervo, Galicia, Spain {NEA} | Filmed in shallow water, dead; found washed ashore following day | Architeuthis dux | Entire; arm tips missing, tentacles, eyes and most of red skin intact; lost by time of stranding when mantle also cut near fins | Entire | Female | ML: 1.20 m; ?WL: ~2 m; TL: 7–8 m [estimate?]; WT: ~100 kg | CEPESMA (Parque de la Vida, Valdés) | [Anon.] (2017f); [Anon.] (2017g); [Anon.] (2017h); [Anon.] (2017i) | [Anon.] (2018b) | Filmed underwater on 28 September by Xan Molina and in more damaged state on beach the following day. Collected by CEPESMA and transferred to Parque de la Vida near Luarca where pre-conserved (not frozen) prior to necropsy planned for November (but not performed as of January 2018 due to poor condition); found to be female. CSIC scientist Carlos Soriano interviewed about find. Likely to originate from Hércules trench off A Coruña according to Luis Laria of CEPESMA. |
| (📷) | 11 October 2017 (reported) | off Punta de Teno, Buenavista, Tenerife, Canary Islands {NEA} | Found floating at surface, dead | giant squid (Note: Referred to by the Spanish equivalent calamar gigante.) | Entire; eye(s) and most of red skin intact, distal end of mantle missing | | | ?EL: 6 m | | [Anon.] (2017j) | Mírame TV Canarias report, 11 October 2017 | Filmed floating at surface; apparently freshly dead. |
| 654 (📷) | October 2017 (evening) | south of El Hierro, Canary Islands, at ~500 m depth {NEA} | Filmed alive briefly interacting with luminescent camera | Architeuthis dux | Entire | None | | ?WL: >3 m [estimate]; WT: >300 kg [estimate] | None | Escánez et al. (2018); Ocampo (2019); Millán (2019); [Anon.] (2019h) | | Second video of live giant squid in natural habitat. Caught on camera lowered from IEO research vessel B/O Ángeles Alvariño, by team studying diet of pilot whales and other cetaceans; filmed for 7 seconds at 7:46 pm. Team included biologist Alejandro Escánez and Eugenio Fraile of IEO. Footage first revealed on 20 June 2018, at 6th International Symposium on Marine Sciences, but only widely reported in June–July 2019, after announcement of #664. Identification confirmed by researchers including giant squid expert Ángel Guerra, primarily on basis of arm and sucker morphology. |
| (📷) | November 2017 | Castroverde bank, 12.5 miles (20.1 km) off Castro Urdiales, Cantabria, Spain {NEA} | Found floating at surface | giant squid | Entire | | | WT: 130 kg | | [Anon.] (2018c); Noya (2018) | | Filmed floating at surface. Collected by skipper Pedro Antonio Fernández San José and son Erlantz of Jangoikoa. Broke into three pieces when brought aboard due to weight. |
| 655 (📷) | 2018 (reported) | Bremer Canyon, Western Australia, Australia {SWP} | Found floating at surface?, dead | Architeuthis dux? | One entire? specimen and additional parts including beak(s) | Not stated | | None given | | Bouchet et al. (2018:20, fig. 17) | | Cause of death unknown but possibly predated by killer whales. |
| (📷) | 6 April 2018 (morning) | Sibutu, Tawi-Tawi, Philippines {NWP} | Found by fisherman, dead | "giant squid" | Entire; skin, tentacles and ends of arms missing | Not stated (none?) | | WL: "just over" 8 ft (2.4 m) [arm tips missing]; BD: 1.5 ft (0.46 m) | | Nelz (2018) | | First record from the Philippines. Photographed and filmed laid out on grass in local village with tape measure; see video. Seen by local fisherman Harold Eduardo Curtis. |
| 656 (📷) | 2018 [reported on 27 April] | off west coast of Tasmania, Australia, at 380 m depth {SWP} | Caught | Architeuthis dux | Entire | None; discarded at sea | | ?WL: ~3 m [estimate]; WT: 80–100 kg [estimate] | None | [Anon.] (2018d); Blackwood (2018) | | Caught by crew of the Empress Pearl, including skipper Alec Harvey. Specimen photographed and thrown overboard. Tentatively identified as Architeuthis dux by Julian Finn of the Melbourne Museum. |
| 657 (📷) | 16 August 2018 | Greymouth, West Coast, New Zealand (42.442146°S 171.195798°E) {SWP} | By hook and line | Architeuthis dux | Entire | Parts | | None given | Auckland War Memorial Museum catalog no. MA124687 | [AWMM] (2018); [AWMM] (2020) | | Collected by Tony Roach. Dissected by teuthologist Kat Bolstad on 21 August 2018. |
| (📷) | 26 August 2018 (morning) | near Red Rocks, south coast of Wellington, New Zealand {SWP} | Found washed ashore | "giant squid" | Entire, in good condition with only "scratch" on top of head; tentacles and reddish skin missing | Entire | | WL: 4.2 m [or 4325 mm]; ML: 2015 mm; EyOD: ~155 mm | | [Anon.] (2018f); [Anon.] (2018g); Howard (2018) | King (2019:pl. 9); numerous media sources | Found on beach by diving brothers Daniel, Jack and Matthew Aplin while driving along track next to shore; measured by them with tape measure. Two much-publicised photos show Jack lying, and Matthew kneeling, next to specimen, respectively. Also photographed in situ by Eddie Howard who took further measurements. Specimen collection organised by NIWA. |
| 658 (📷) | November 2018 | Ama-cho, Nakanoshima, Oki Islands, Shimane Prefecture, Japan {NWP} | Caught in net; filmed at surface | giant squid | Entire; red skin missing | | | ?WL: <2 m | | "shimashoku_terakoya" (2018); [Anon.] (2018h) | | Filmed at surface. First reported on 28 November 2018. Flesh tasted; described as having strange acidity. |
| 659 (📷) | 29 December 2018 (reported; seen previous night) | Shinminato port, Imizu-shi, Toyama Prefecture, Japan {NWP} | Filmed and photographed alive at surface | giant squid | Entire; red skin largely intact, missing from distal end | | | None given | | Keisho (2018) | | Found alive at surface by Yasuyoshi Keisho; photographed and filmed multiple times. |
| 660 (📷) | 30 January 2019 | off Izumo, Shimane Prefecture, Japan {NWP} | Caught in net | giant squid | Entire; mantle and limbs separated, red skin missing | | | ML: 166 cm | | [Anon.] (2019b) | | On public display. Landed on day of capture at Sakai fishing port in Sakaiminato, Tottori Prefecture. Announced by Tottori Prefectural Fisheries Experimental Station. Gladius exhibited at Ibaraki Nature Museum. |
| 661 (📷) | 31 January 2019 | off Nanao, Ishikawa Prefecture, Japan {NWP} | Caught in fixed net | giant squid | Entire; eye(s) intact, tentacles and red skin missing | Entire | Male | WL: 3.22 m; WT: 71 kg | Ibaraki Nature Museum | [Anon.] (2019c); [Notojima Aquarium] (2019); [Anon.] (2020h); [Anon.] (2020i); Miyazaki (2022); [Anon.] (2022a); [Anon.] (2022b); [Anon.] (2022c); [Anon.] (2022i) | TV Asahi report, 4 February 2022; KFB report, 4 February 2022 | Caught in same net as oarfish, Regalecus russelii (3.84 m long). Both died at time of landing at Kishibata fishing port and were taken to Notojima Aquarium; placed on public display 1–3 February, then dissected. Displayed in preservative fluid as part of public exhibit "Deep Sea Mystery 2020: The World Seen by the Giant Squid" at Ibaraki Nature Museum, Bandō, 18 July – 4 October 2020; thereafter on permanent display on first floor in 318 × 90 × 52 cm acrylic tank. Museum was temporarily closed on 3 February 2022 after ~1 tonne of formalin leaked from tank; specimen was temporarily wrapped in water-soaked cloth to preserve it. Museum reopened on 9 March with giant squid stored in freezer and not on display. |
| 662 (📷) | 21 February 2019 | mouth of Shimoko River, Shimoko-cho Hamada, Shimane Prefecture, Japan {NWP} | Found washed ashore, dead | giant squid | Entire; eye(s) intact, tentacles and majority of red skin missing | Entire | Female (mature) | ML: 158 cm; WL: 340 cm; EL: 600–700 cm [estimate]; WT: 135 kg | Shimane AQUAS Aquarium | Isobe (2019); [Anon.] (2019d); [Anon.] (2019f); [Anon.] (2019i) | [Tsuriho] (2019) | Spotted from car by local woman who contacted Shimane AQUAS Aquarium; collected by staff. Examination by Tsuyoshi Fujita and others revealed eggs. Stored frozen before being placed on public display on ice in late March as part of annual Aquas Spring Festival, where visitors could touch the thawed specimen. Public dissection performed on 3 November 2019. |
| 663 (📷) | 1 April 2019 | off Kisakata fishing port, Nikaho, Akita Prefecture, Japan {NWP} | Found in gill net, dead | giant squid | Entire; tentacles, arm tips and much of red skin missing | Entire | | ?WL: 3 m | Oga Aquarium GAO | [Anon.] (2019e); [Anon.] (2019g) | | Found by local fisherman Kenichi Sasaki around 10:30 am; landed in Kisakata fishing port. Collected by staff from Oga Aquarium GAO on 2 April; placed on public display there on 6–7 April. |
| 664 (📷) | 17 June 2019 (Note: A few months earlier, a different research group had released a trio of weighted alligator carcasses nearby to study how such animal falls are scavenged in the deep ocean. After eight days, one of the alligators could no longer be found, having apparently been dragged along the sea floor before the thick rope attaching it to the weight was bitten through. It has been suggested that it may have been scavenged by a giant squid, perhaps even the same individual recorded by the NOAA team, though a large shark such as a sleeper (Somniosus) or sixgill shark (Hexanchus) would seem the likeliest candidate.) | near Appomattox deep-water oil rig, Gulf of Mexico (28.4773°N 87.4468°W), at 759 m depth {NWA} | Filmed alive from remote camera system | Architeuthis dux (most likely) | Entire | None | (juvenile?) | ML: ~1.7 m [estimated from arm length]; WL: >3.4 m [estimated from arm length]; AL: >1.68 m [estimated from video stills; excludes distal portion];? EL: up to >20 ft (6.1 m) [estimate] | None | Johnsen & Widder (2019); [NOAA] (2019); Jarvis (2019); Adkins (2019); Mack (2019); Langlois (2019); DeFede (2019); Burns (2020); Robinson et al. (2021:4, figs. 4–5); [ORCA] (2021); Learn (2021); Kingery (2021); Widder (2021:239, 270) | Numerous media sources | Widely reported as second video of live giant squid in natural habitat, but actually third (see #654). Attracted using "e-jelly" and bait bag containing ~250 g of fresh mahi-mahi (Coryphaena hippurus). Captured on video on three brief occasions over ~6 minutes. Initially maintained distance before striking on third occasion; tentacle first limb to make contact but only one arm became attached. Filmed over bottom depth of ~1800 m; water temperatures 6.3 °C. Length of single arm in contact with "e-jelly" estimated from video stills by correcting for perspective; length of entire animal estimated from this. Likely juvenile female or mature male based on size. NOAA-funded team included Nick Allen, Sönke Johnsen, Megan McCall, Nathan Robinson (see video), Tracey Sutton, and Edith Widder, as well as FIU marine scientists Heather Bracken-Grissom and Lori Schweikert. Expedition dubbed "Journey into Midnight". Ship's long-range antenna destroyed by lightning shortly after footage seen for first time; one computer destroyed but laptop with only copy of giant squid video survived. |
| 665 (📷) | 28 June 2019 | Jodogaura Coast, northeastern part of Okinoshima, Oki Islands, Shimane Prefecture, Japan {NWP} | Found floating at surface by shore, dead | giant squid | Entire; red skin and tentacles(?) missing | | | ?WL: 3.12 m; ?AL: 1.9 m; WT: ~100 kg [estimate] | | Osada (2019); [Tsuriho] (2019) | | Photographed by local, Mr. Nozu. Estimated to have died 1 day prior to discovery. |
| 666 | November 2019 – January 2020 | Toyama Bay, off Toyama Prefecture, Japan {NWP} | Caught in fixed nets (separately) | giant squid | Three specimens | | | None given | | Yanagisawa (2020); [Anon.] (2020e) | | One specimen caught in each of November, December, and January. |
| 667 (📷) | 17 December 2019 | off Ine-cho, Kyoto Prefecture, Japan {NWP} | Caught in fixed net | giant squid | Entire, with eggs | Entire | Female | ?WL: ~4 m; WT: ~100 kg; ED: ~1 mm | | [Anon.] (2019k) | [Anon.] (2020g) | Found with eggs. On public display at Uocchikan Aquarium in Miyazu, 20–22 December. |
| 668 (📷) | 19 December 2019 | off Obama-shi, Fukui Prefecture, Japan {NWP} | Found floating at surface, dead | giant squid | Entire; one tentacle and reddish skin missing | | | ?WL: 3 m; EL: ~6 m | | [Anon.] (2019j) | | Found by Kyoto fisherman at around 4 am and secured with rope. Landed in Uku fishing port, Obama-shi; collected by prefectural fisheries centre. |
| 669 (📷) | 20 January 2020 (early morning) | off Ine-cho, Tango Peninsula, Kyoto Prefecture, Japan {NWP} | Caught in fixed net, filmed alive | giant squid | Entire; missing tentacles and arm tips | Entire | | ML: 1.35 m; ?WL: ~4.8 m; WT: ~140 kg | Kyoto Aquarium | Kurokawa (2020); [Anon.] (2020a); [Anon.] (2020b); [Anon.] (2020c); [Anon.] (2020d) | | Filmed alive at surface during capture. Stored on ice and transported to Kyoto Aquarium, where displayed on ice in free area by entrance on 21–22 January 2020. Eyes damaged due to pressure differential. |
| 670 (📷) | 21 January 2020 (morning) | Chatham Rise, New Zealand, at 442 m depth {SWP} | By trawl | giant squid | Entire; eyes intact, tentacles and red skin largely missing | "nearly 50 kg of samples", including eyes, head, stomach, and reproductive organs | | ?WL: >4 m; WT: 110 kg | Auckland University of Technology? | [Anon.] (2020f); Georgiou (2020); [AUT] (2020) | | Taken by NIWA-operated RV Tangaroa around 7 am during expedition to survey hoki. Crew included voyage leader and NIWA fisheries scientist Darren Stevens. Dissected on board by PhD student Ryan Howard of Auckland University of Technology, where saved parts later sent. |
| 671 (📷) | 12 February 2020 (morning) | Toyama Bay, off Hayatsuki River, Uozu-shi, Toyama Prefecture, Japan, at 80 m depth {NWP} | Caught in fixed net | giant squid | Entire; mantle separated from head and limbs | Parts, including beak | | ?ML: 1.5 m; ?MW: 45 cm; ?WL: 3.48 m; WT: 73.3 kg | Uozu Aquarium | Yanagisawa (2020); [Anon.] (2020e) | | Found around 2 am; measured and dissected at Uozu Aquarium. Fourth specimen from Toyama Bay since November 2019. Appearance may be linked to unseasonably high local sea temperatures (1 °C higher than normal). |
| (📷) | 2 March 2020 | Sinchang-ri, Janggi-myeon, Nam-gu, Pohang, North Gyeongsang Province, South Korea {NWP} | Found washed ashore, dead | giant squid | Entire; tentacles and reddish skin missing | None | | WL: ~3 m | | K.-T. Kim (2020); C.-H. Choi (2020); Son (2020) | | Found on beach around 3 pm by Pohang residents who reported it to local administrative agency. Janggi-myeon office in Pohang City received notification of specimen and disposed of it. |
| 672 (📷) | 19 March 2020 | Bremer Bay, southwestern Australia (34.46°S 119.35°E), at ~800 m depth {NWP} | Filmed alive from remote camera system | Architeuthis dux | Entire; tentacles intact | None | | TCL: 1.0–1.2 m [estimate]; ML: 2.3–2.8 m [estimate] | | Kubodera et al. (2021:1, figs. 3–4); Inoue et al. (2021) | | First recording of giant squid using tentacles for feeding. Tentacular club length (TCL) estimated from footage; mantle length (ML) estimated from TCL. First broadcast in Japan on 11 April 2021. |
| 673 (📷) | 7 June 2020 (reported) | off Japan {NWP} | Caught on fishing line, filmed alive | Architeuthis dux | Entire; reddish skin partly missing, hole in mantle | Entire | | None given | | Morelli (2020a) | | Filmed alive at surface. |
| 674 (📷) | 7 June 2020 (morning) | Golden Mile Beach, Britannia Bay, Western Cape, South Africa {SEA} | Found washed ashore, filmed alive | Architeuthis dux | Entire, excellent condition; eyes and reddish skin intact, tentacles and arm tips missing, no obvious bite marks or injuries | Entire | | WL: 4.19 m; AL: ~8 ft (2.4 m) [estimate]; WT: 200–300 kg [estimate] | SAM | Baxter (2020); Gibbings (2020); Agnew (2020); Geggel (2020); McGreevy (2020) | | Found stranded alive by Richard Davies, who recorded footage of specimen contracting mantle and inking; also observed using suckers. Also photographed on beach (dead) by Adéle MomNdele Grosse. First moved to holding facility in Saldanha Bay; from there moved to Cape Town by Wayne Florence, Albe Bosman and Toufiek Samaai to form part of Iziko Museums of South Africa collection; there measured, sampled for DNA, and beak extracted. Initially stored in −30 °C walk-in freezer due to COVID-19 restrictions. |
| [13] (📷) | 14 June 2020 | 10 miles (16 km) from Humboldt Bay Entrance Channel, California, United States, at 1,500 ft (460 m) depth {NEP} | By bottom trawl | "likely a juvenile giant squid"; Onykia robusta | Entire | None | | EL: 14 ft (4.3 m); WT: 150 lb (68 kg) | | Ferrara (2020); Morelli (2020b) | | Non-architeuthid. Caught by fishermen Shane Ranstrom and Clark Ward of the Joy Ann. Returned to sea. |
| 675 (📷) | 18 November 2020 | Oda fishing port, Izumo, Shimane Prefecture, Japan {NWP} | Found washed ashore | giant squid | Entire; missing reddish skin | Entire | | WL: 2.5 m; WT: 50 kg | Shimane AQUAS Aquarium | [Anon.] (2020j) | | Found by angler who contacted Shimane AQUAS Aquarium. Condition suggests animal had been dead for some time. Frozen specimen on public display at aquarium 21–23 November. |
| 676 (📷) | 17 December 2020 | Iwagahana beach, Miyazu, Kyoto Prefecture, Japan {NWP} | Found washed ashore | giant squid | Entire; reddish skin missing | Not stated | | ?ML: ~1.5 m; ?WL: ~3 m | | [Anon.] (2020k) | | Found by local married couple on beach in front of their house at around 6 am. |
| 677 (📷) | 26 January 2021 | Inome fishing port, Izumo, Shimane Prefecture, Japan {NWP} | Found at surface, filmed alive | giant squid | Entire; tentacles missing, reddish skin largely intact | Entire | | ML: 1.67 m; WL: 4.1 m; WT: 170 kg; EL: ~6 m [estimate; if complete] | Shimane AQUAS Aquarium | [Anon.] (2021a); [Anon.] (2021b); [Anon.] (2021c); Sakakibara (2021a); [Anon.] (2021d); [Anon.] (2021e); Sakakibara (2021b); [Anon.] (2021f); Kayahara (2021); Momozawa (2021) | FNN News report; [Anon.] (2022j); numerous media sources | Found by local fisherman off Shimane Prefecture coast and secured with rope at Inome fishing port. Filmed alive at surface in weakened state by staff member of Shimane AQUAS Aquarium; observed moving arms, contracting funnel, and inking. Died soon after discovery; collected by Shimane AQUAS Aquarium and frozen there for later study. Displayed at aquarium on 10 February ("Fan Club Day") in frozen state, measuring 218 cm in length with arms folded; 8 groups of 18 members could visit and lie on bench next to specimen. Appearance of this specimen and #678 nearby sparked fears of imminent earthquake, which were quickly dispelled by experts. |
| 678 (📷) | 28 February 2021 (reported) | unspecified beach in Tottori Prefecture, Japan {NWP} | Found washed ashore, dead | giant squid | Entire; eye(s) intact, tentacles and reddish skin missing | Unclear; small tissue samples saved for study; beak, sucker rings, eye lens, and ink sac extracted | | weight of arm: ~6 kg [estimate] | | Takanori (2021); [Anon.] (2021h); Miyahara (2021) | ABEMA Morning broadcast on AbemaNews, 8 March 2021 | Found by fisheries worker Mr. "Ikaniko" while returning from solo camping trip to Oki Islands; cooked and eaten by him. Considered too salty for sashimi even after being thoroughly washed in fresh water; pieces eaten on beach after cooking on portable stove. Taste described as salty and bittern-like but also like that of culinary squid species; addition of vinegar and desalting with fresh water improved taste and lessened off-putting odour. Pieces taken home later grilled and sun-dried to make surume. Frozen samples given for DNA analysis to university professor studying species. |
| 679 (📷) | 16 March 2021 | near Himekawa fishing port, Itoigawa-shi, Niigata Prefecture, Japan {NWP} | Found at surface, filmed alive | giant squid | Entire | Entire | | ?WL: 3.2 m; WT: 47 kg [wet] | Joetsu Aquarium Umigatari | [Joetsu] (2021); [Anon.] (2021i); [Anon.] (2021j); [Anon.] (2021m); [Anon.] (2021n) | | Filmed in early hours by Tsutomu Sagawa of Matsumoto, Nagano Prefecture, who was visiting Itoigawa and had come to catch firefly squid, after seeing crowd gathered at shore. Filmed forcefully ejecting water from funnel. Group of men tried to lift squid out of water but were unable to due to its weight. Tentatively identified by Hiroyuki Imura, assistant exhibition manager at Niigata City Aquarium Marinepia Nihonkai, who also commented on value of rare footage. Displayed in frozen state in front of touching pool on ground floor of Joetsu Aquarium Umigatari on 20–21 March 2021. Appearance linked to heavy snowfall; both apparently caused by Tsushima Current. |
| 680 (📷) | 2 April 2021 | on beach, Nishikan-ku, Niigata-shi, Niigata Prefecture, Japan {NWP} | Found washed ashore, dead | giant squid | Entire; tentacles and two arms missing, reddish skin largely intact | Entire | | ?WL: ~2.4 m; WT: 106 kg | | [Anon.] (2021k); [Anon.] (2021l) | ANN News report, 2 April 2021 | Recovered by 8 staff of Niigata City Aquarium Marinepia Nihonkai and transported there by car; displayed at aquarium for two days until 4 April, immersed in ice water and covered in transparent sheet through which it could be touched by visitors. Stomach contents was to be examined in detail. |
| 681 (📷) | 9 February 2022 | near mouth of Michiguchi River, Echizen fishing port, Echizen-cho, Fukui Prefecture, Japan {NWP} | Found washed ashore, dead | giant squid | Entire; tentacles and reddish skin largely missing | None | | ML: 126.5 cm; AL: 286 cm; WT: ~50 kg [estimate]; EL: >4 m [estimate] | | [Echizen] (N.d.); Ando (2022); [Anon.] (2022d); [Anon.] (2022e); [Anon.] (2022f); [Anon.] (2022g); [Anon.] (2022h) | Good! Morning broadcast on ANN News, 23 February 2022 | Found by group of residents who reported it to Echizen Community Centre around 10:30 am. Filmed in situ, including by Toshiyuki Tanaka, director of local aquarium Kunimi Jellyfish Public Hall. Measured by Seiji Sasai and other staff of Echizen Matsushima Aquarium. Not considered worth preserving due to small size. 1.5-metre long arm given to Fumiya Tamaki, employee of nearby Echizen Seafood Restaurant, who first tasted it raw but could not finish due to its bitterness; later peeled off skin, cut into flat 15 × 10 cm pieces and cooked for ~30 minutes (due to high water content), releasing smell of ammonia, before seasoning with mayonnaise, soy sauce, and sudachi, which reportedly rendered it edible though "not delicious". Only Tamaki tasted squid; both main specimen and arm were disposed of. Videos of specimen generated much interest online. |
| 682 (📷) | 15 March 2022 (reported) | Koura Beach, Matsue-shi, Shimane Prefecture, Japan {NWP} | Found washed ashore | giant squid | Entire, poor condition; mantle badly damaged | Not stated | | ?WL: ≥2 m [estimate] | | [Anon.] (2022j) | TSK TV report, 15 March 2022 | Suckers collected by discoverer for further examination under microscope; morphology matched that of giant squid; identification supported by Shimane Prefectural Fisheries Technology Center. Size estimated based on comparison with plastic bottle in photos. |
| 683 | Septembre 2026 | Waters off British Isles | Caught in trawling net | giant squid | Mantle missing | All | Immature | SL: 300cm [estimate]; TL : 600cm [estimate]; Head to arm : 430cm | Muséum d'Histoire naturelle du Havre, France | | Tendance Ouest report, 02 november 2026 | Specimen initially captured in 2007, preserved in alcohol, and subsequently donated to the Le Havre Museum in 2026. It is the second such specimen to be held in a French museum. |

== Specimen images ==
The following images relate to giant squid specimens and sightings since 2015. The number below each image corresponds to that given in the List of giant squid table and is linked to the relevant record therein. The date on which the specimen was first documented is also given (the little-endian day/month/year date format is used throughout).

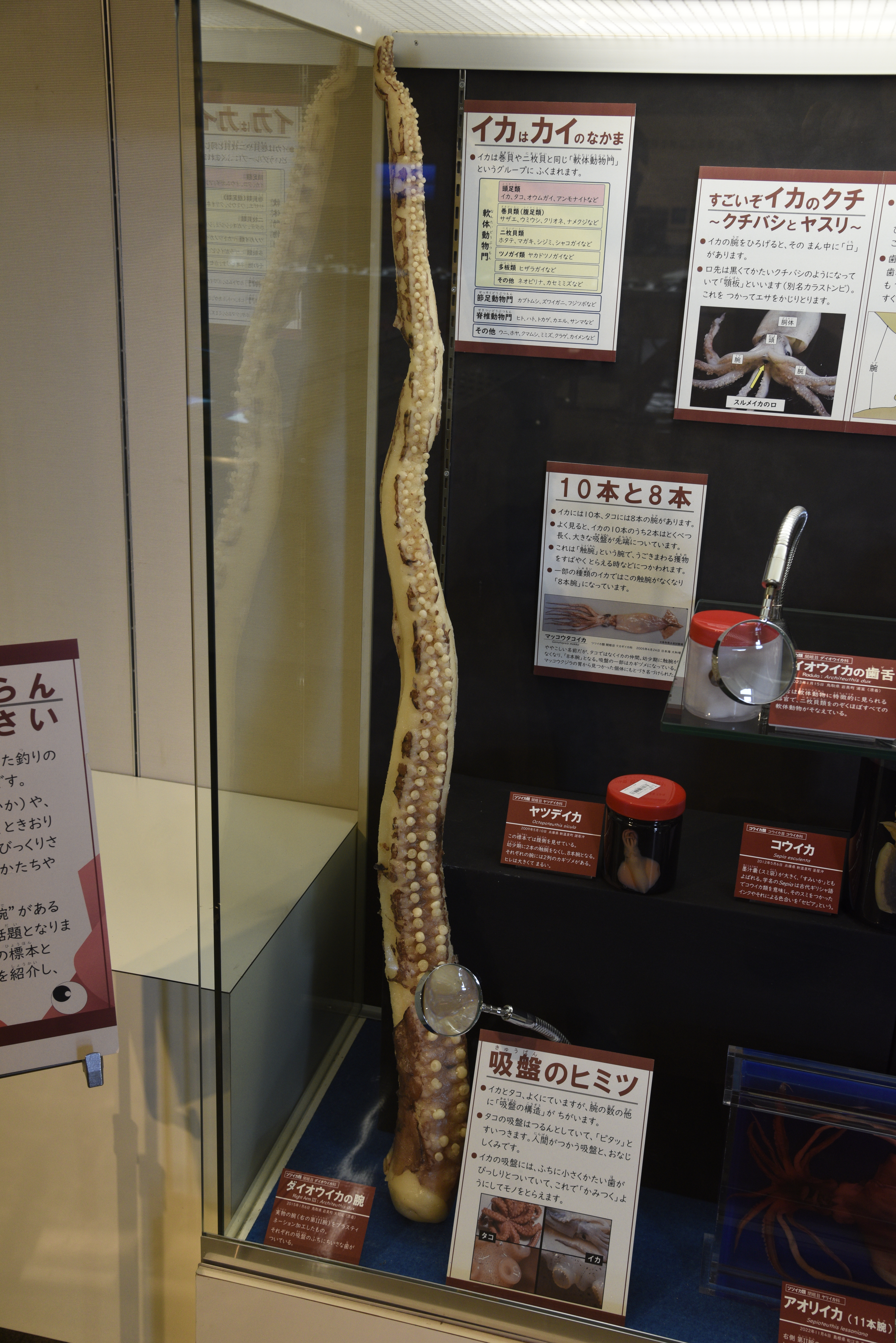
#609 (6/1/2015)
Plastinated right arm III of giant squid found stranded on a beach in Iwami, Tottori Prefecture, Japan, on 6 January 2015; part of a temporary display at Tottori Prefectural Museum in May 2023 (see also display overview and information label)

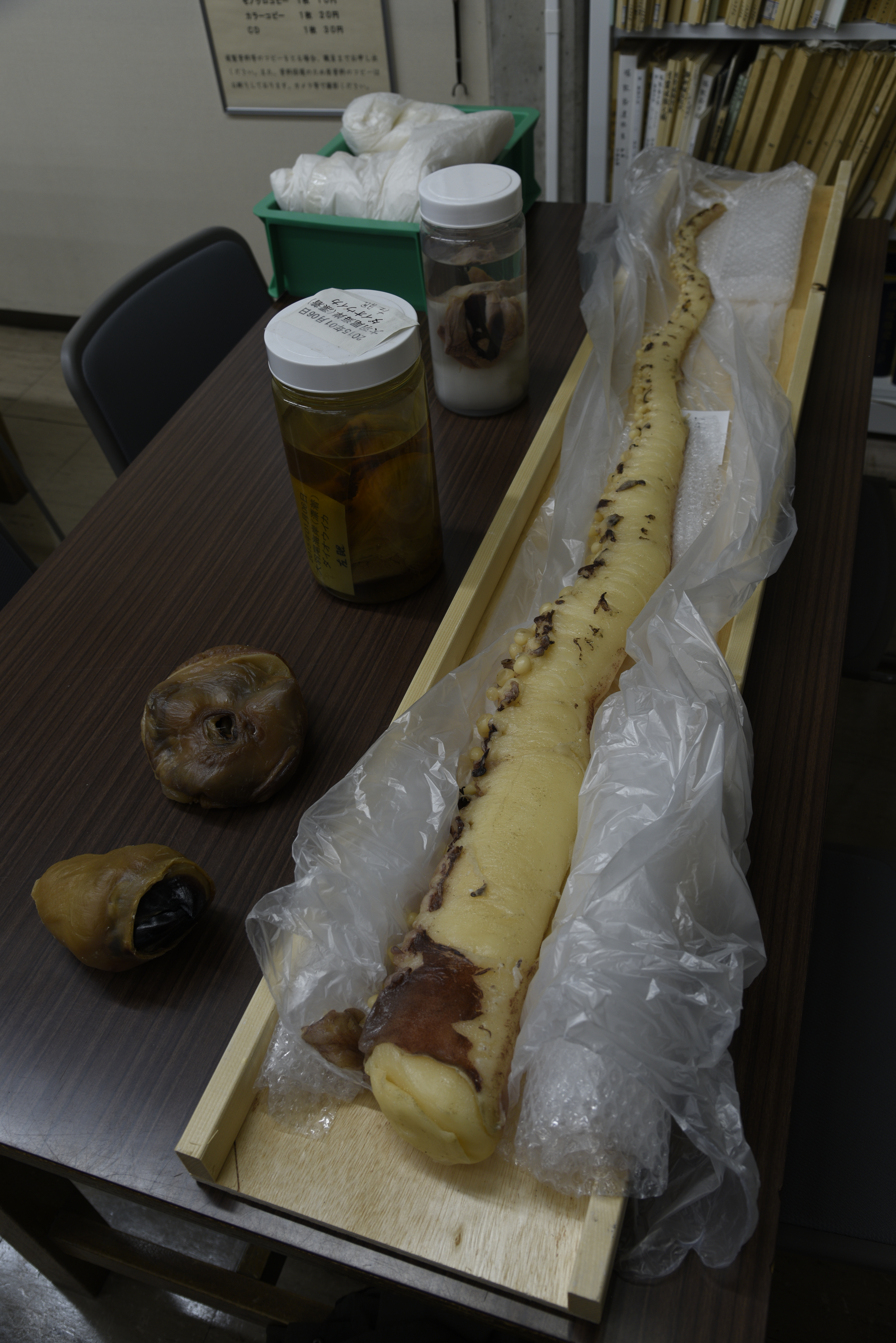
#609 (6/1/2015)
Second plastinated arm from the same specimen, likewise stored at Tottori Prefectural Museum though not publicly displayed (see also view from distal end and closeup of arm tip)

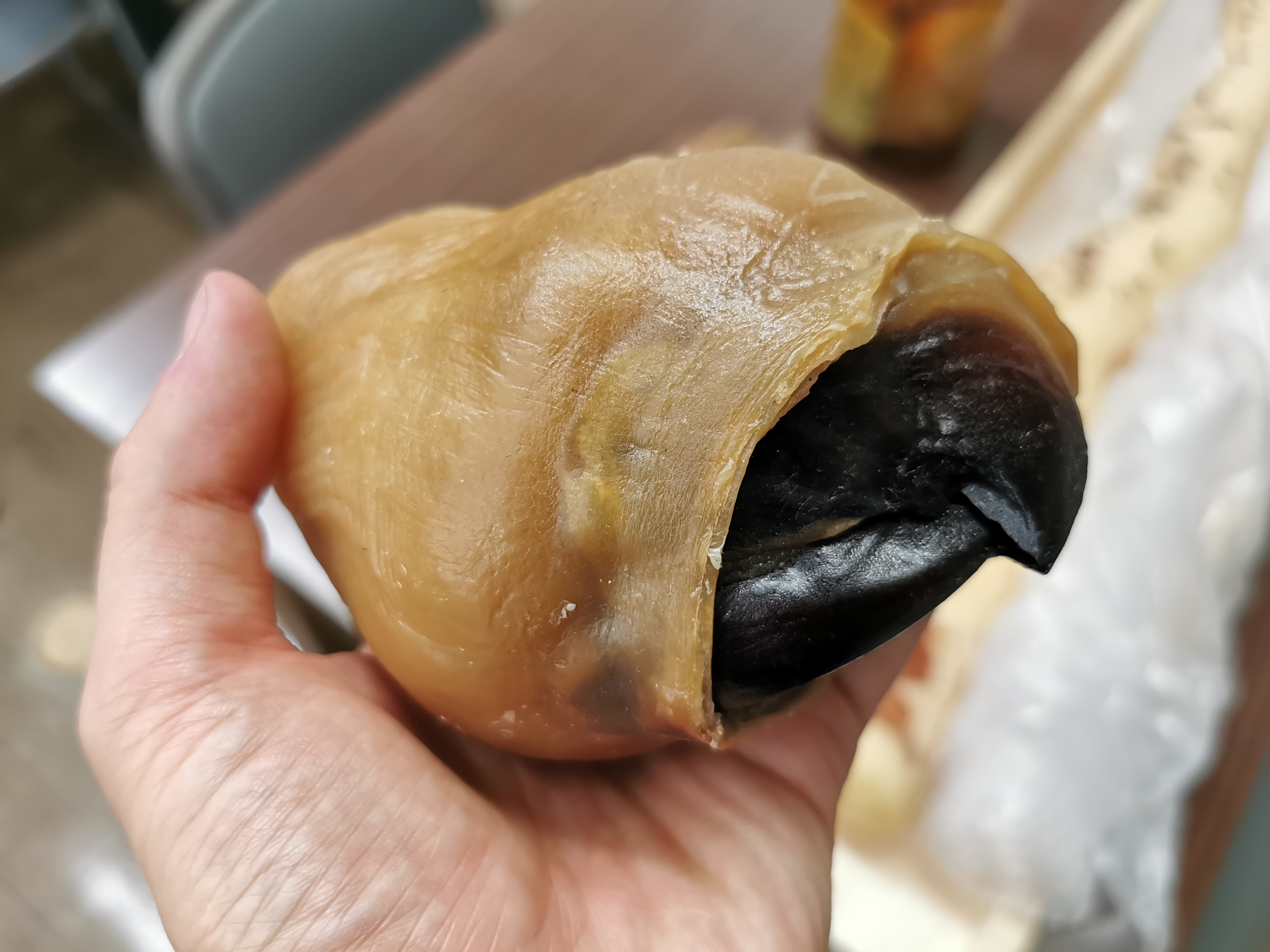
#609 (6/1/2015)
Plastinated beak and associated buccal tissue from the same specimen, deposited at Tottori Prefectural Museum but not publicly exhibited

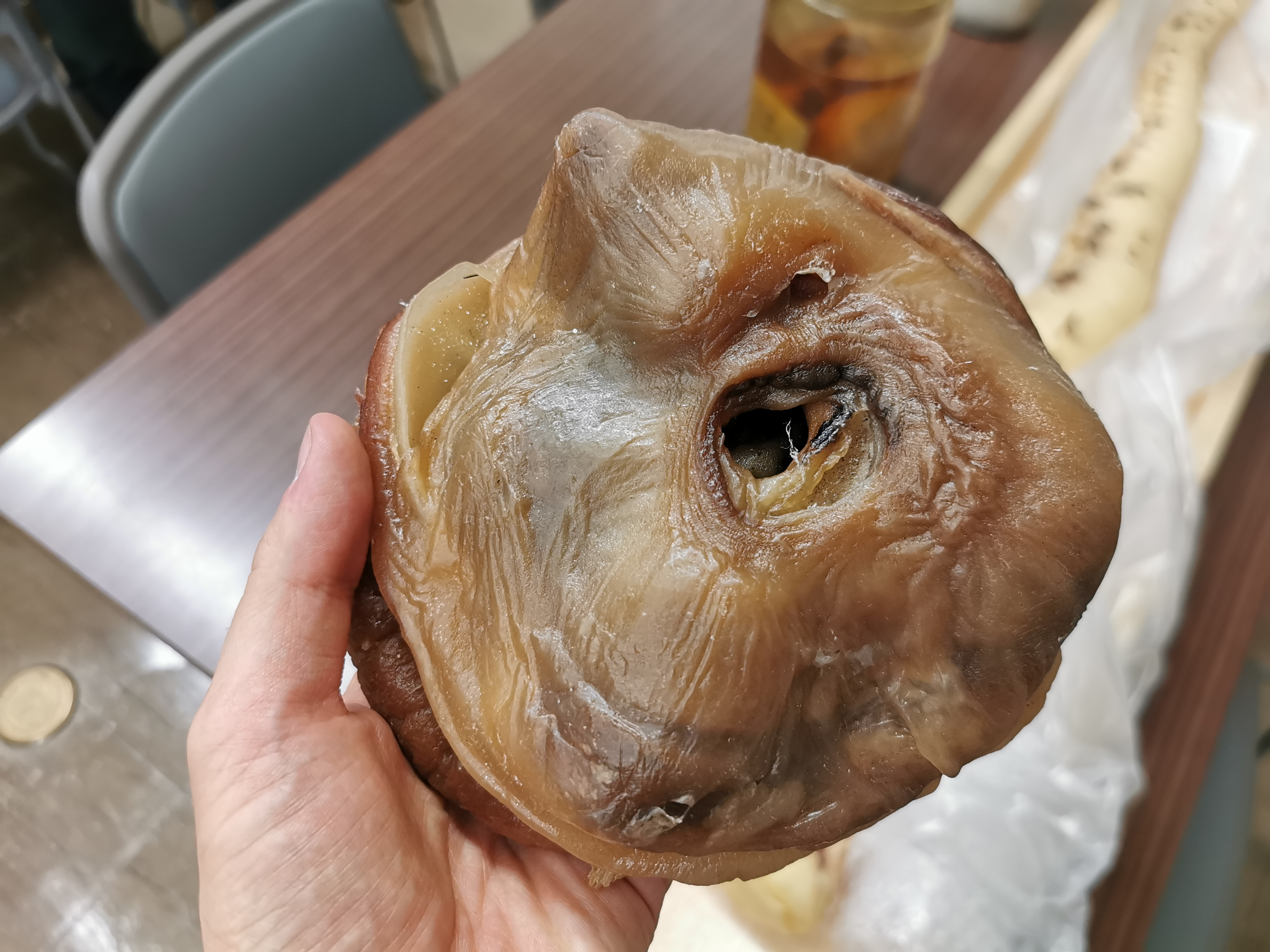
#609 (6/1/2015)
Collapsed right eyeball from the same specimen, preserved through plastination and held at Tottori Prefectural Museum but not displayed publicly

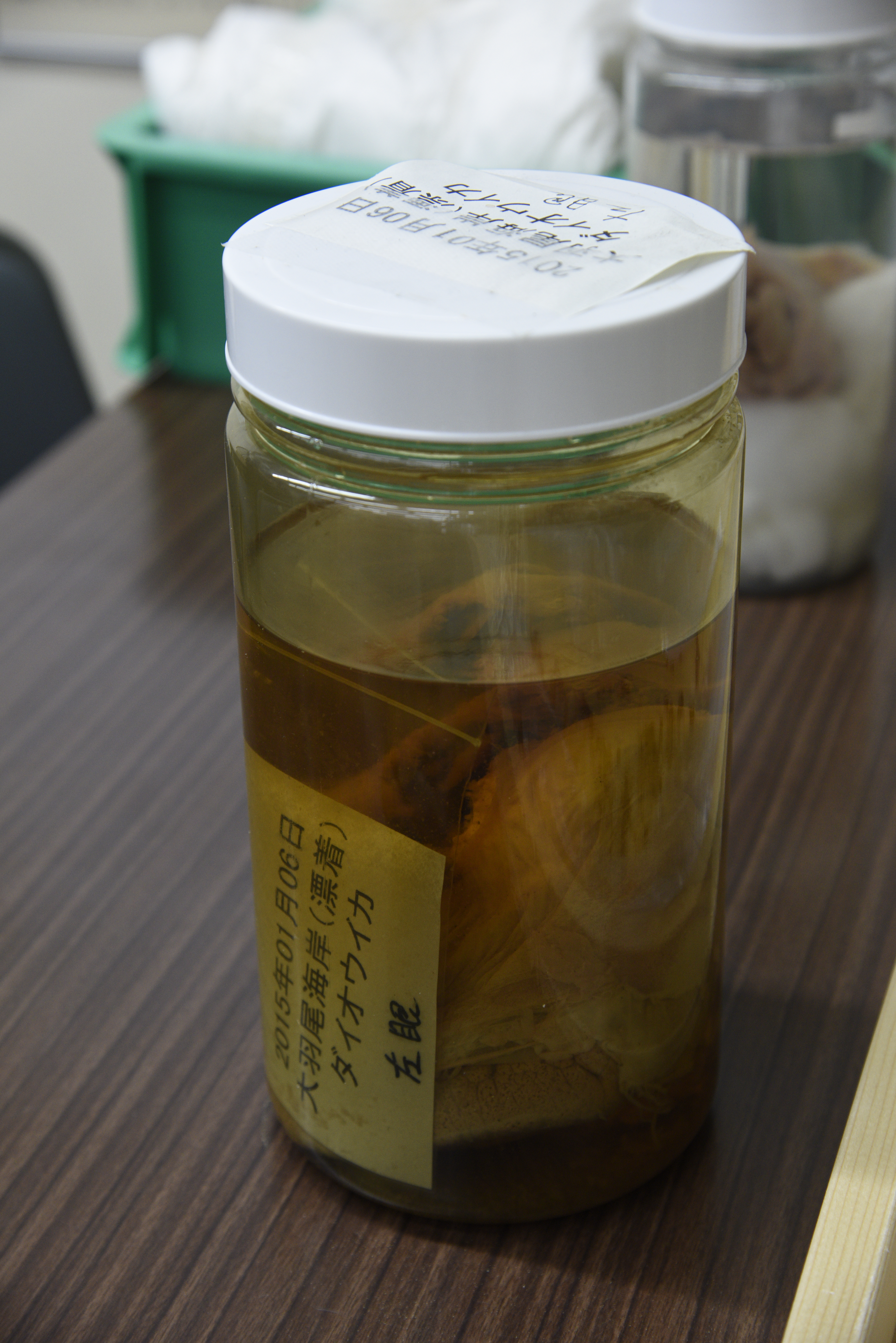
#609 (6/1/2015)
Wet-preserved left eye from the same specimen, kept at Tottori Prefectural Museum but not on public display

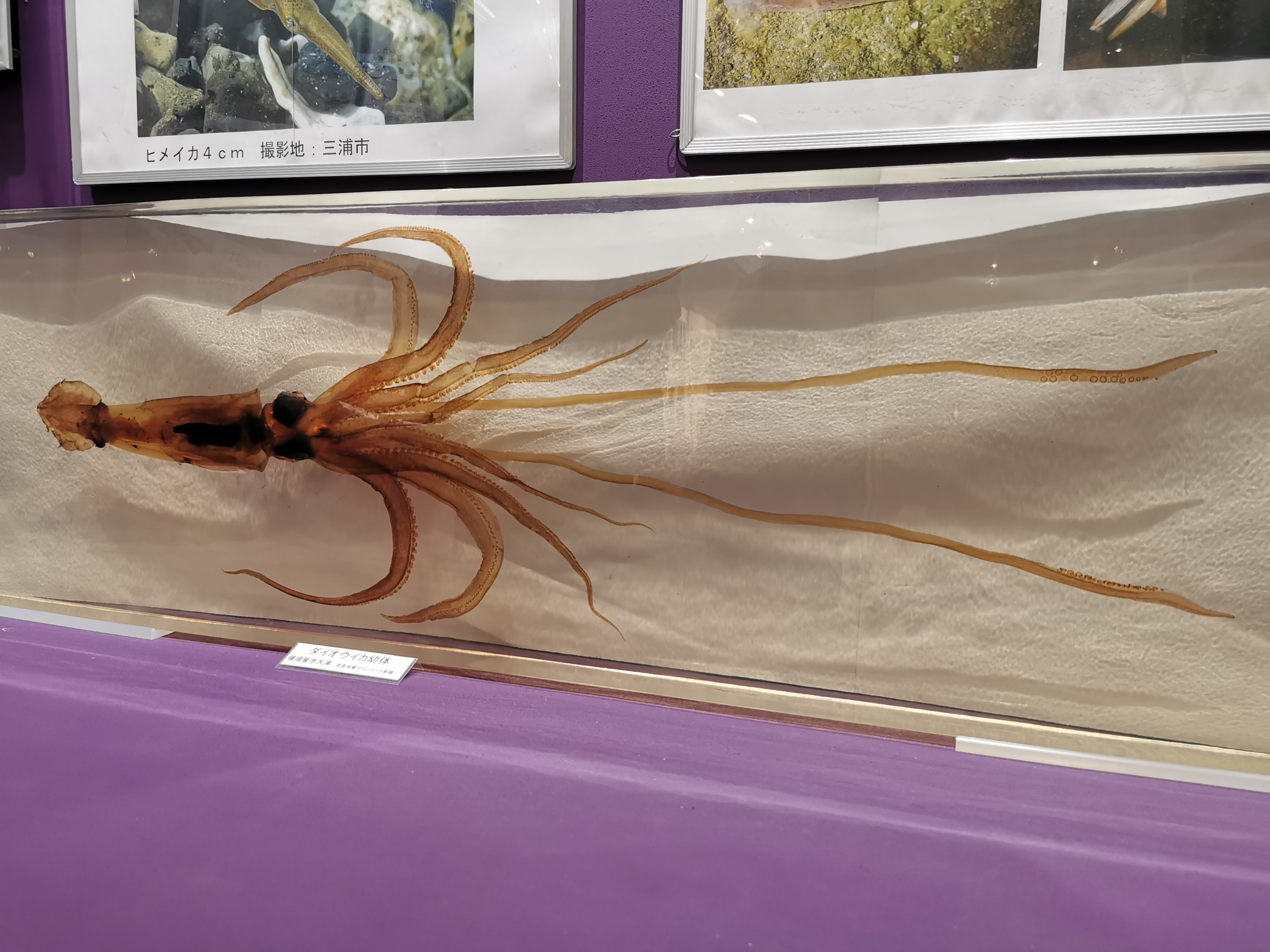
#632 (6/5/2015)
Giant squid caught alive in Tokyo Bay, Japan, on 6 May 2015. Displayed embedded in acrylic block at Kannonzaki Nature Museum, together with a second, formalin-preserved specimen (#573) (see also overview of display).

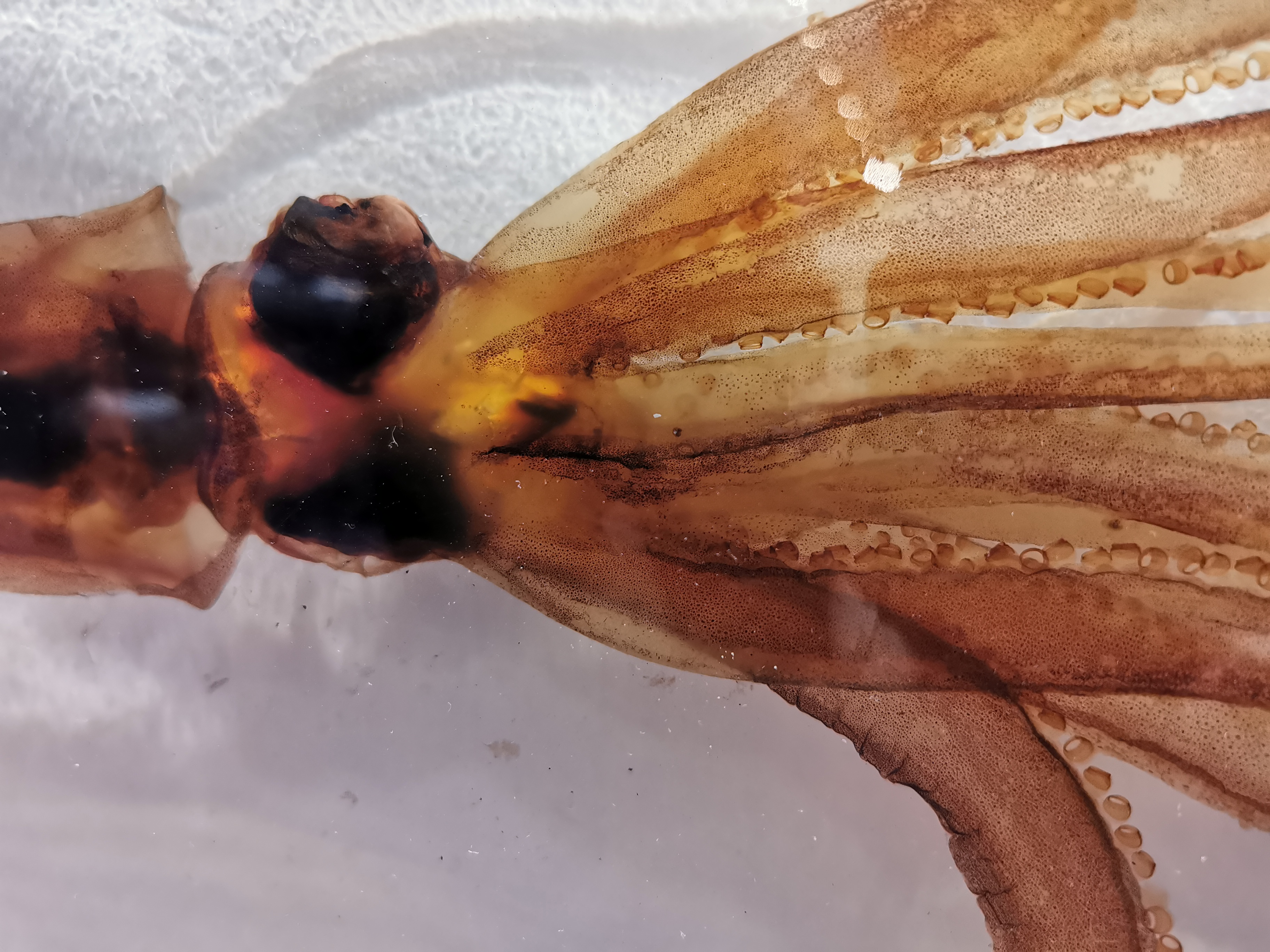
#632 (6/5/2015)
Closeup of head and arm crown of the same specimen; its unusual preservation in acrylic rendered its tissues largely translucent – note dark eyeballs and beak (centre-left) (see also closeups of mantle and head and tentacular club)

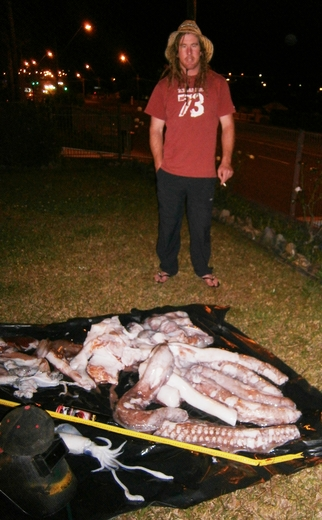
#634 (17/5/2015)
Remains of a giant squid gaffed from the surface off Wollongong, New South Wales, Australia, on 17 May 2015. The specimen was collected by Ryan Field (pictured) and Ben Allaham. It is shown here alongside a "typical" squid for size comparison.

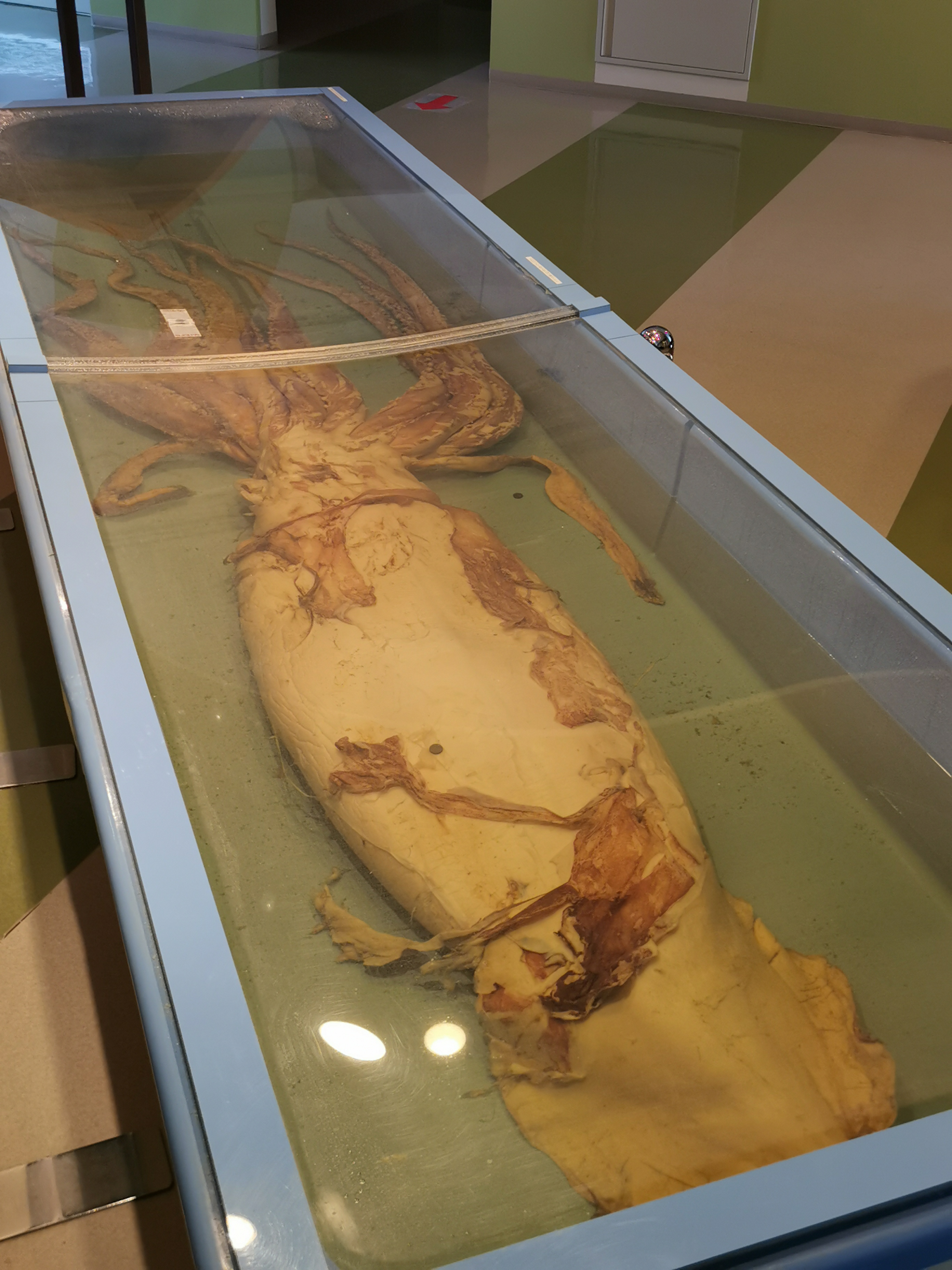
#642 (17/1/2016)
Specimen found stranded ashore on 17 January 2016 near Noto, Ishikawa Prefecture, Japan. On display at the Ishikawa Prefectural Natural History Museum, preserved in formalin (see also wider view and extracted parts).

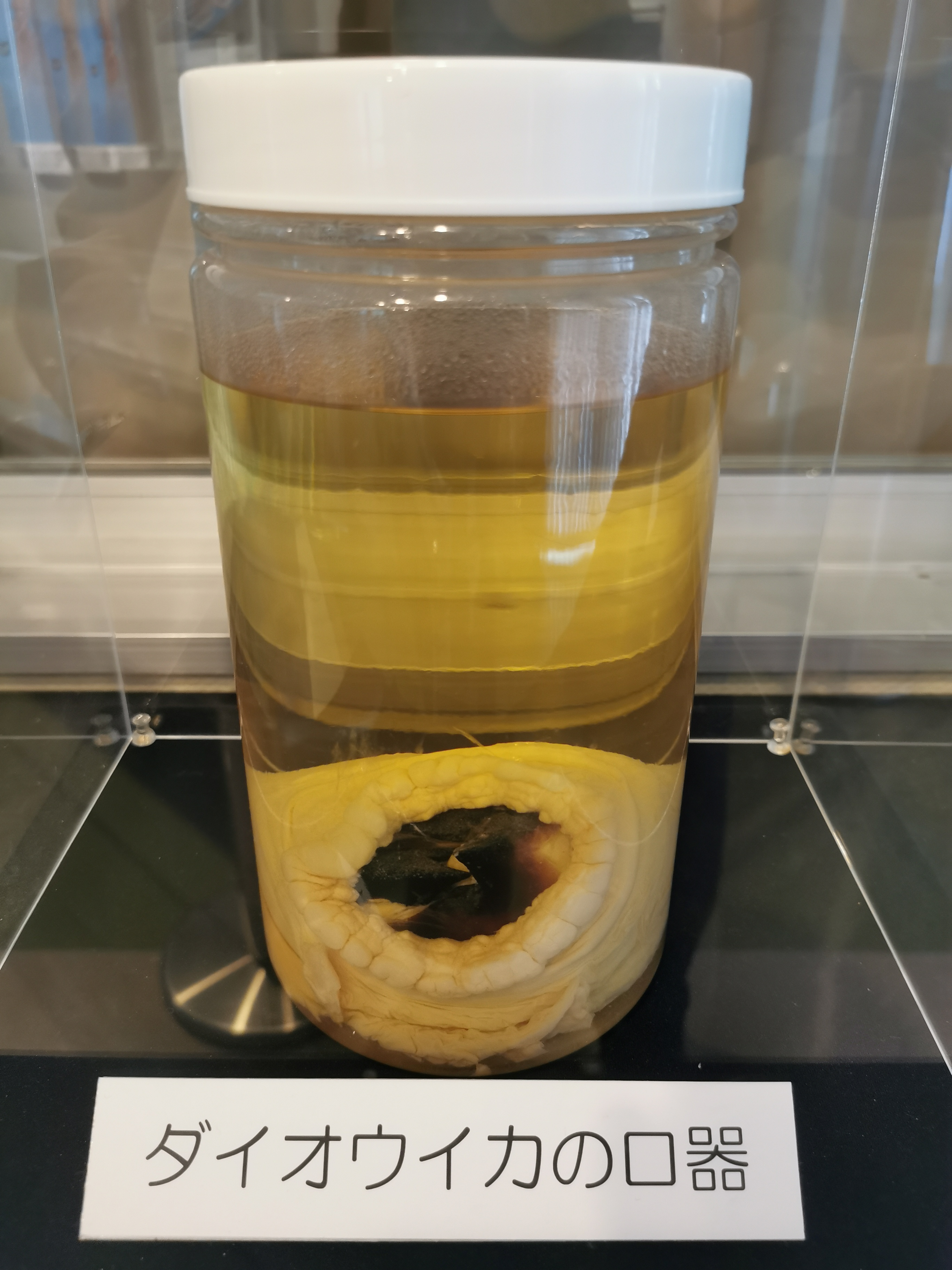
#642 (17/1/2016)
Beak and associated buccal tissue removed from the same specimen (see also side view)

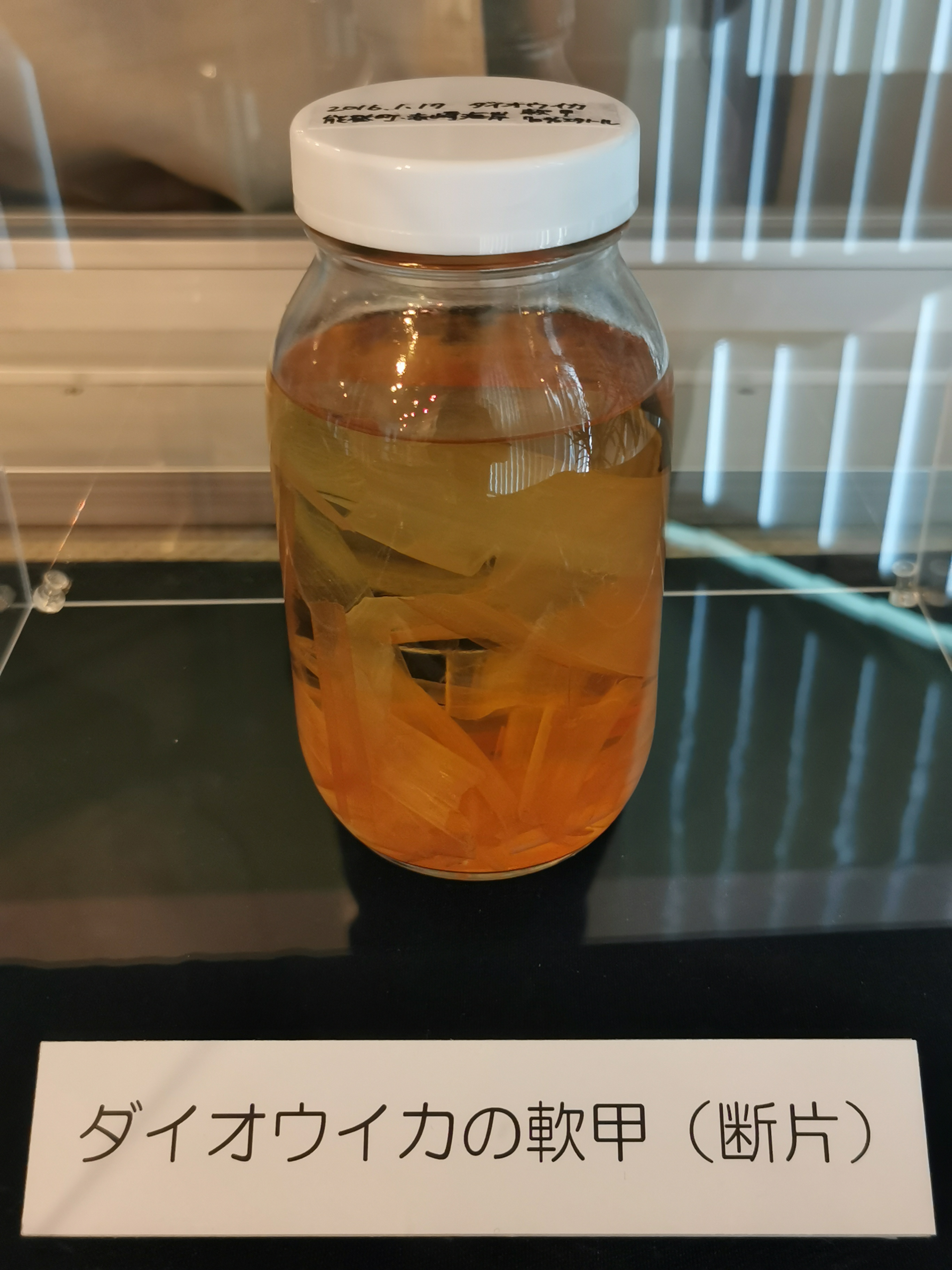
#642 (17/1/2016)
Gladius from the same specimen

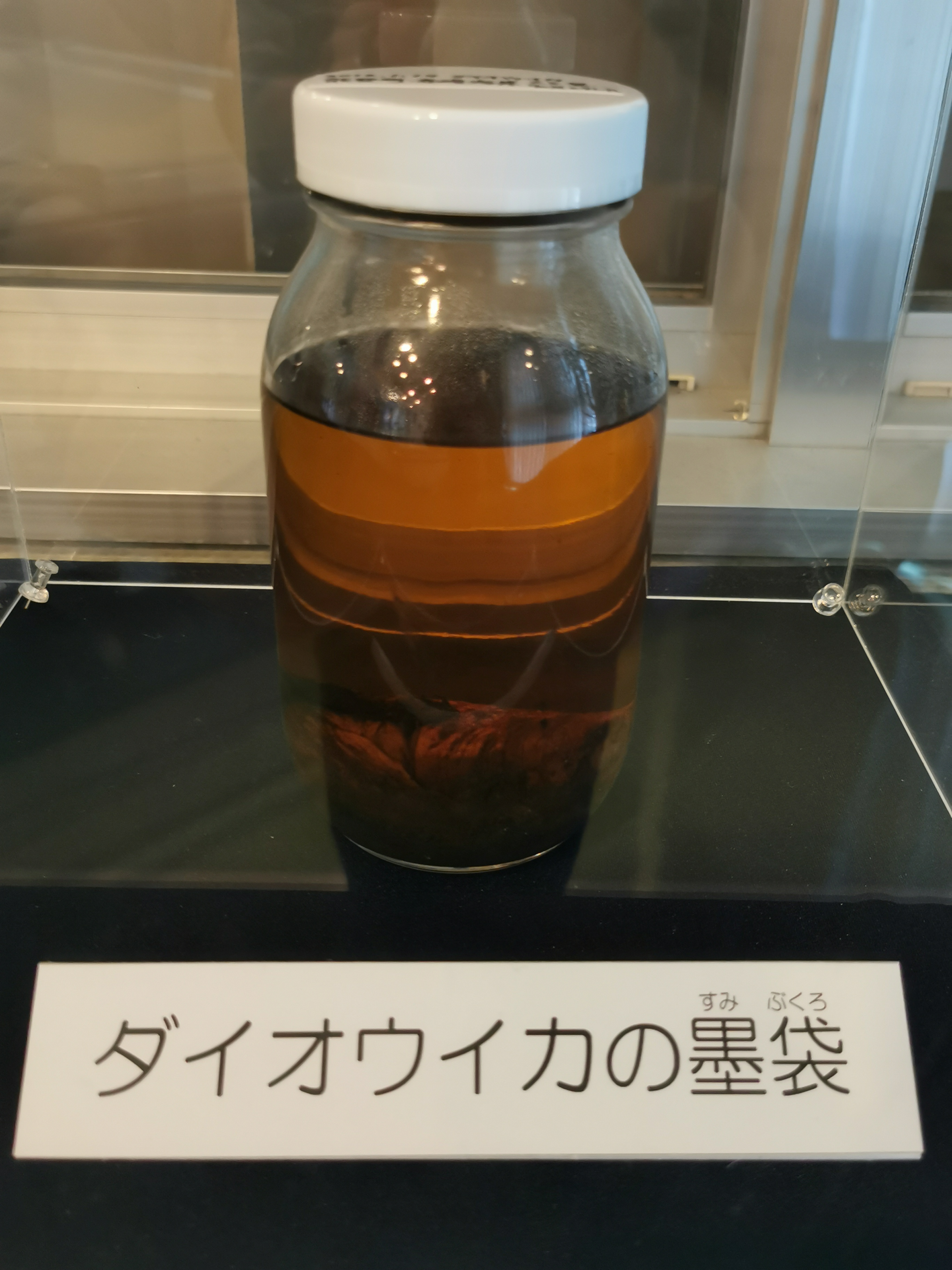
#642 (17/1/2016)
Ink sac from the same specimen

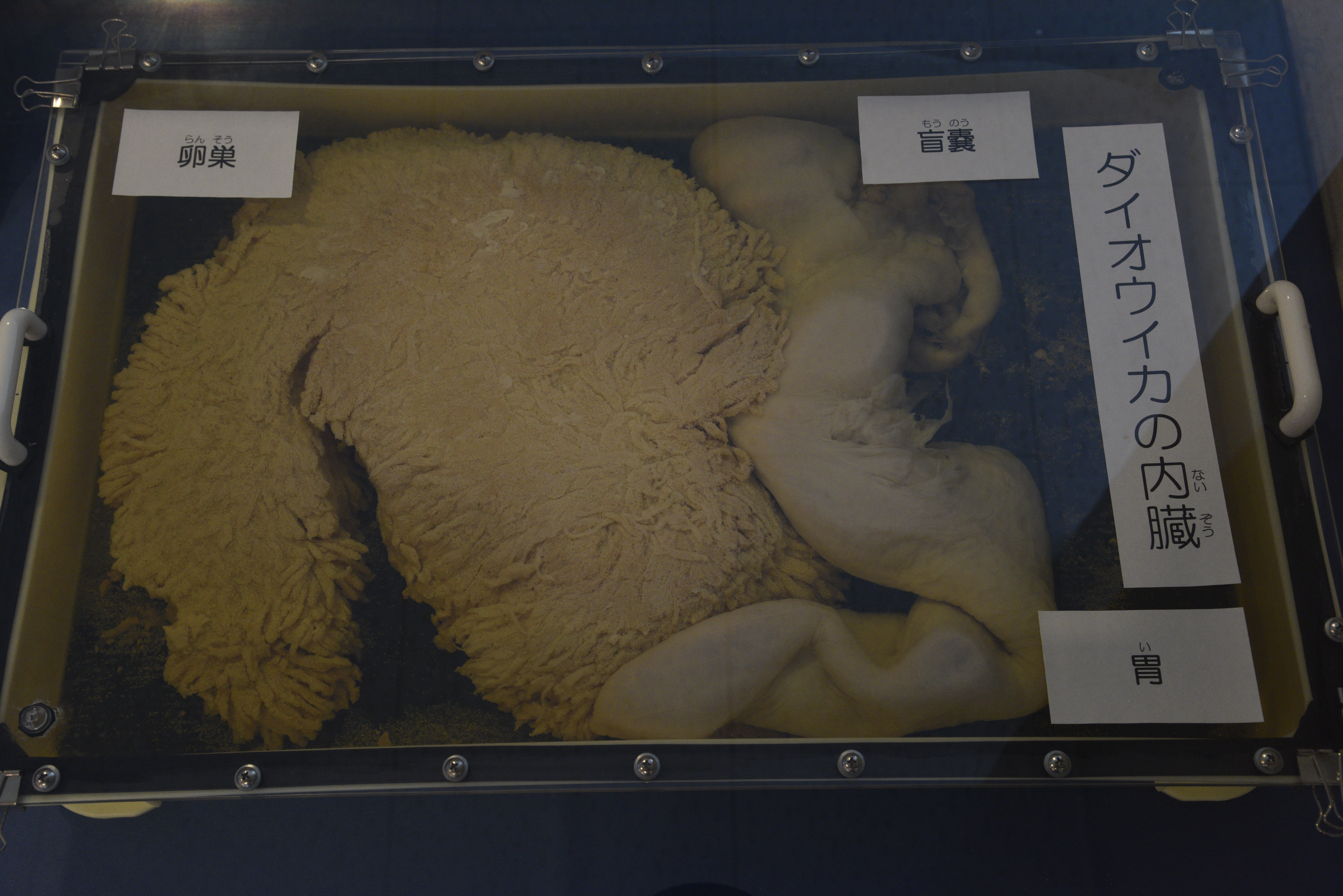
#642 (17/1/2016)
Well-developed ovary and associated caecum and stomach dissected from the same specimen

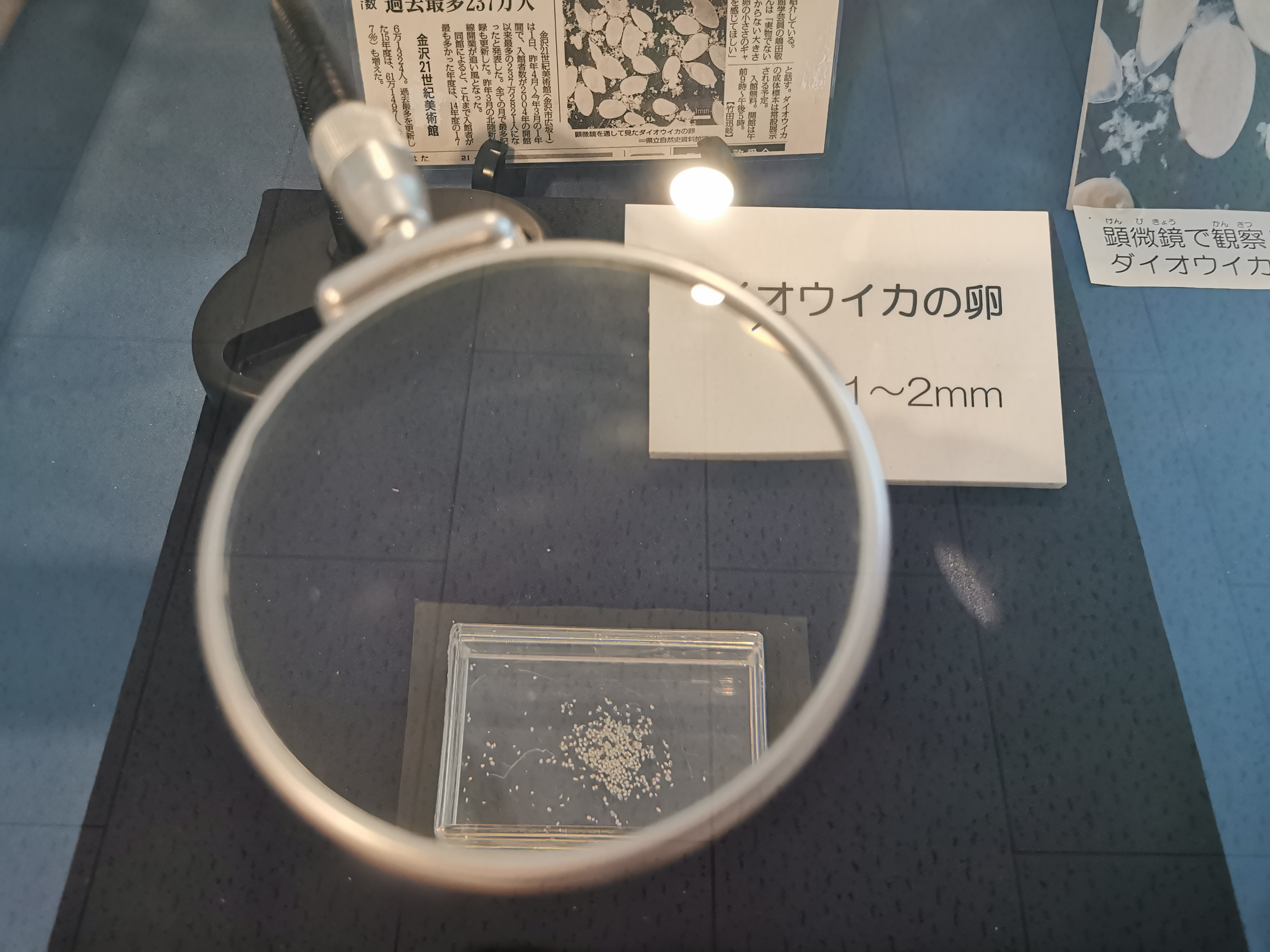
#642 (17/1/2016)
Individual eggs from the same specimen; they were estimated to number more than 10 million in total

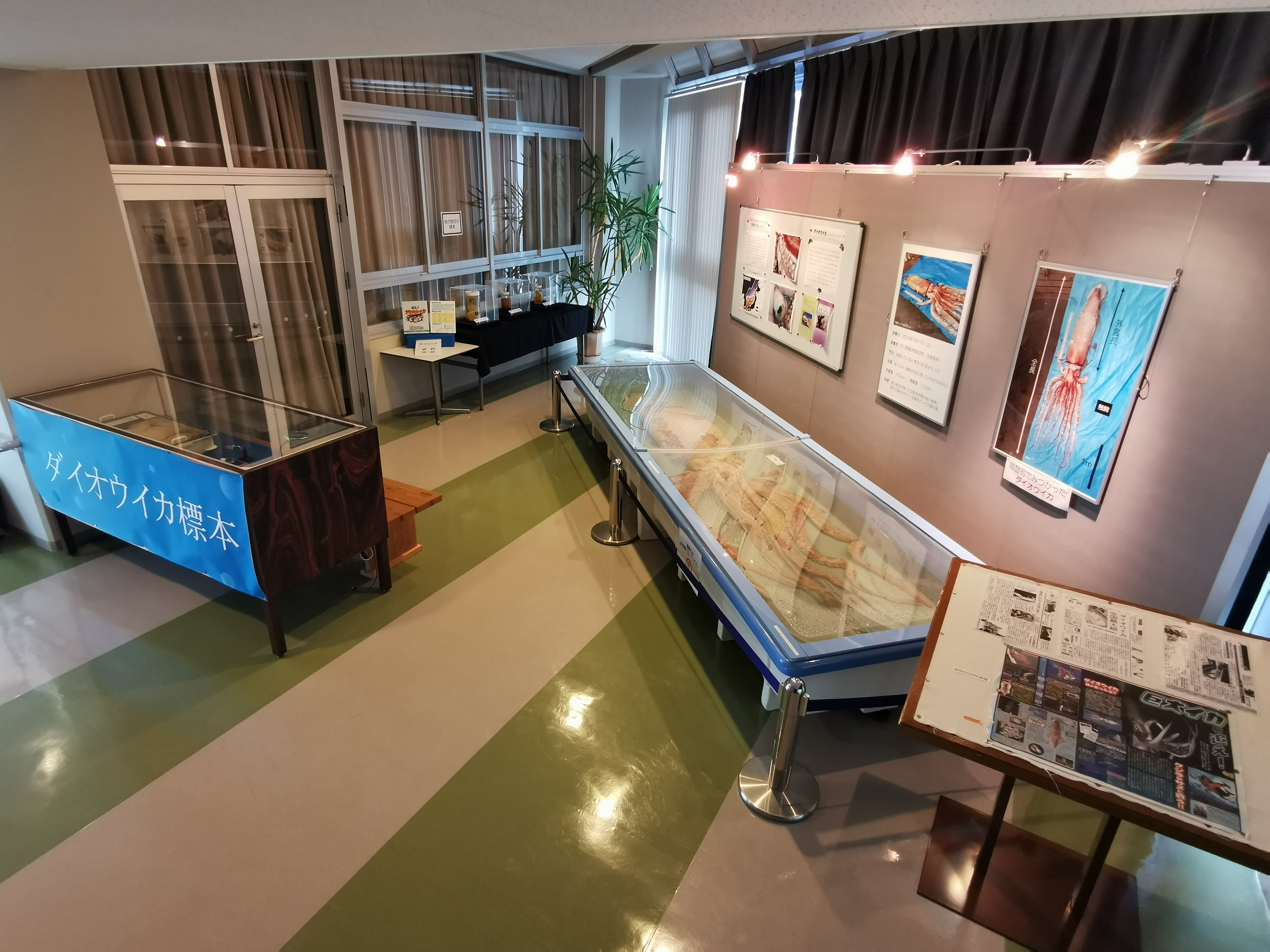
#642 (17/1/2016)
Overview of entire giant squid display at the Ishikawa Prefectural Natural History Museum

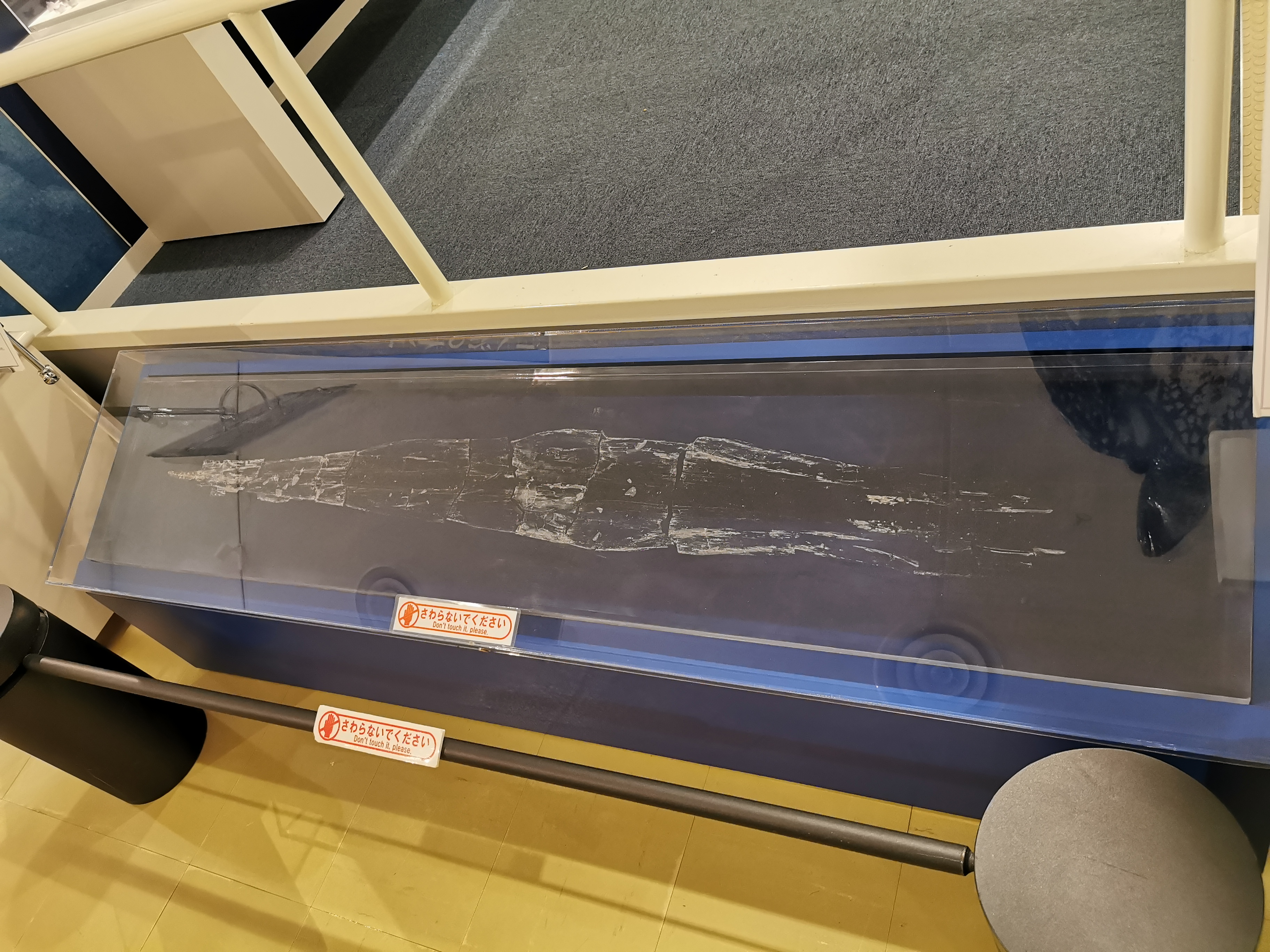
#643 (4/2/2016)
Gladius (internal shell) from a poorly preserved specimen found washed ashore on 4 February 2016 on a beach in Tottori City, Tottori Prefecture, Japan. On display at San'in Kaigan Geopark Museum of the Earth and Sea, together with a whole specimen (#566).

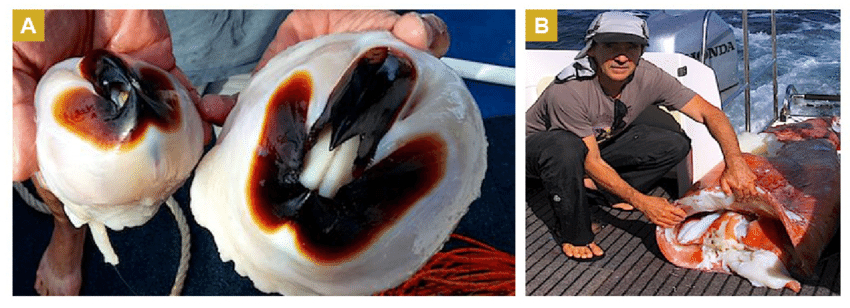
#655 (≤2018)
Giant squid found dead in Bremer Canyon off southwestern Australia, possibly after being predated by killer whales. Photographs show a pair of giant squid beaks (A) and researcher John Totterdell holding a large mantle (B).

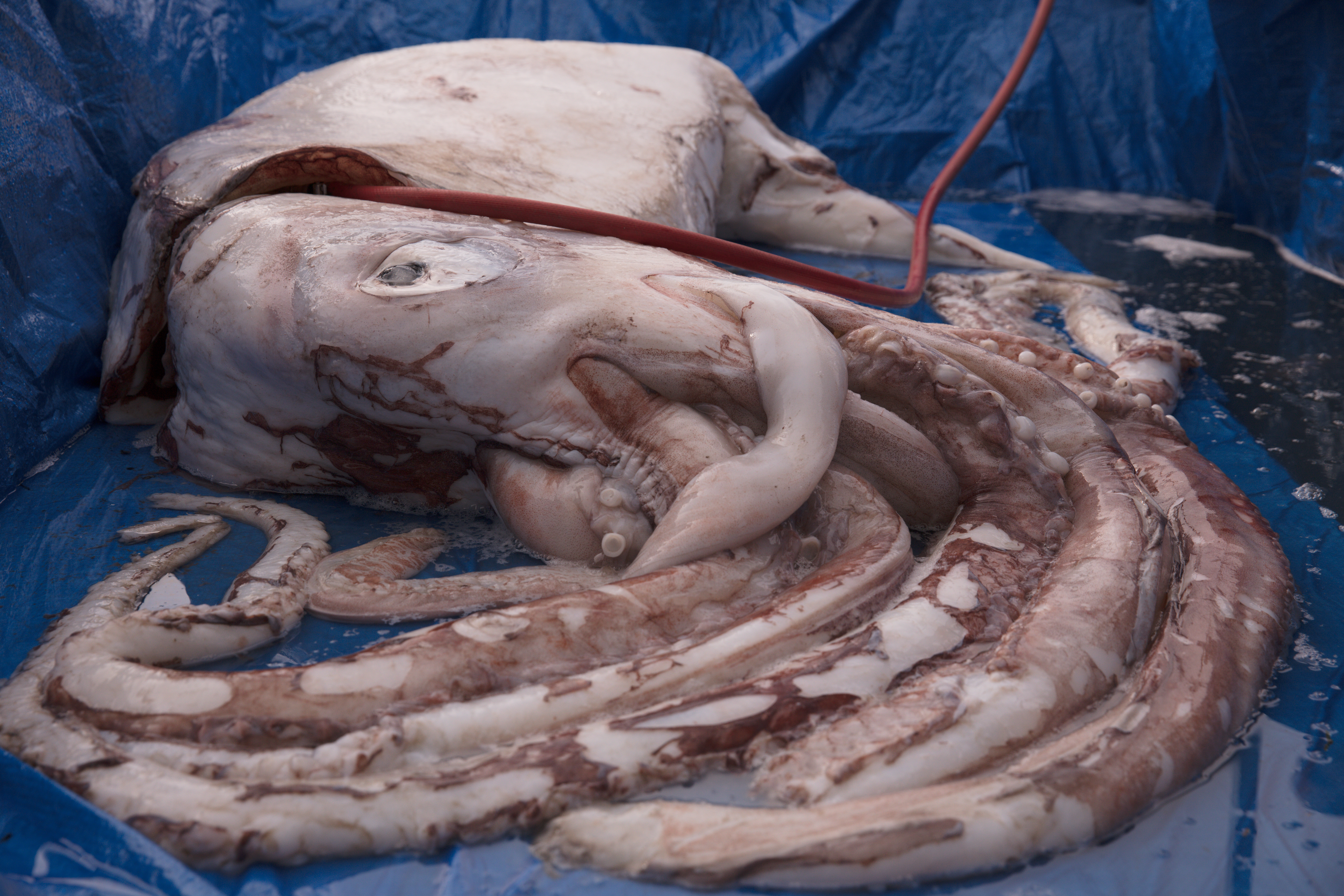
#657 (16/8/2018)
Giant squid caught by hook and line off Greymouth, New Zealand, shown here on the day of its dissection at the Auckland War Memorial Museum (see also during dissection)

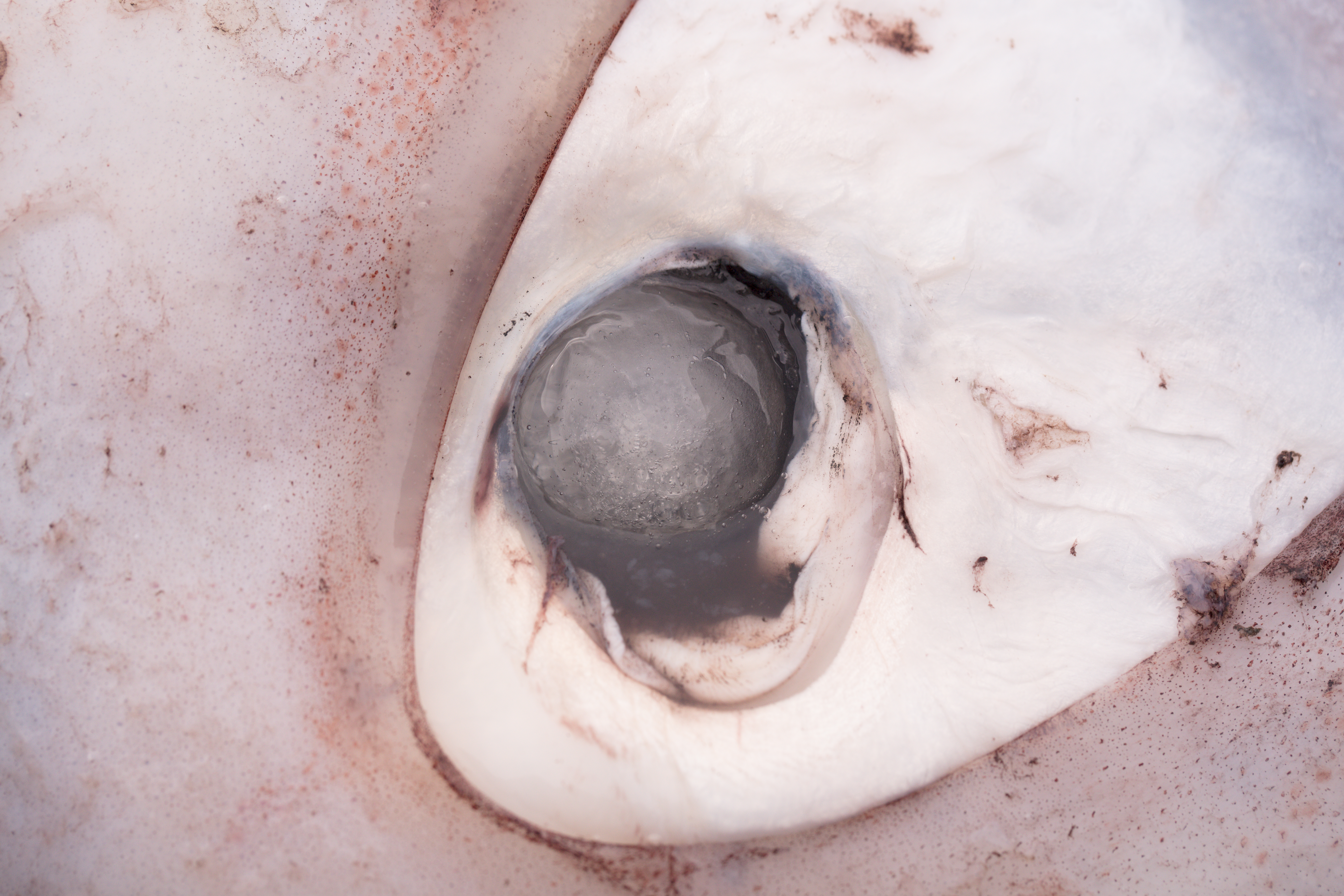
#657 (16/8/2018)
Closeup of one of the eyes of the same specimen

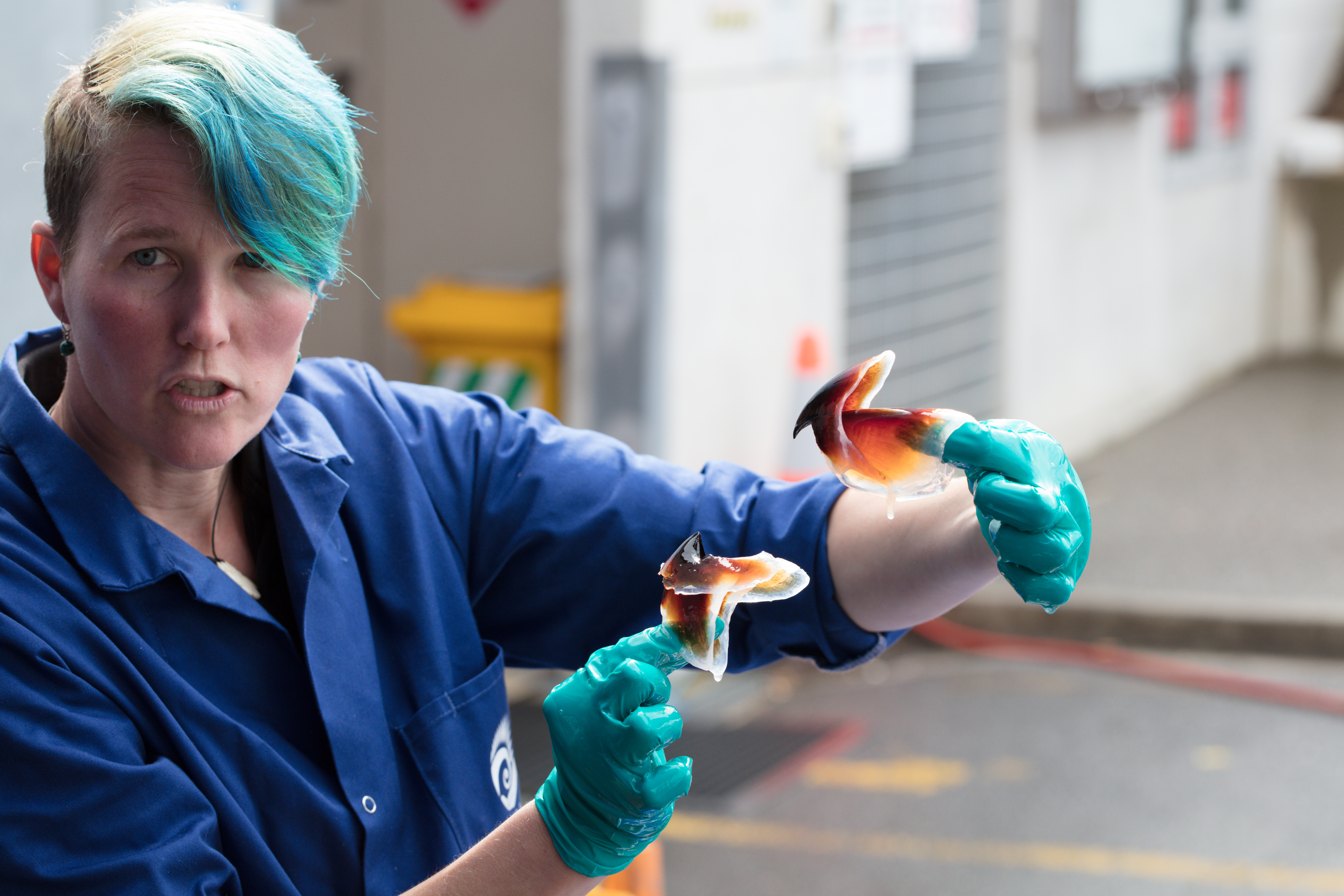
#657 (16/8/2018)
Teuthologist Kat Bolstad, who led the dissection, with the extracted lower and upper beaks

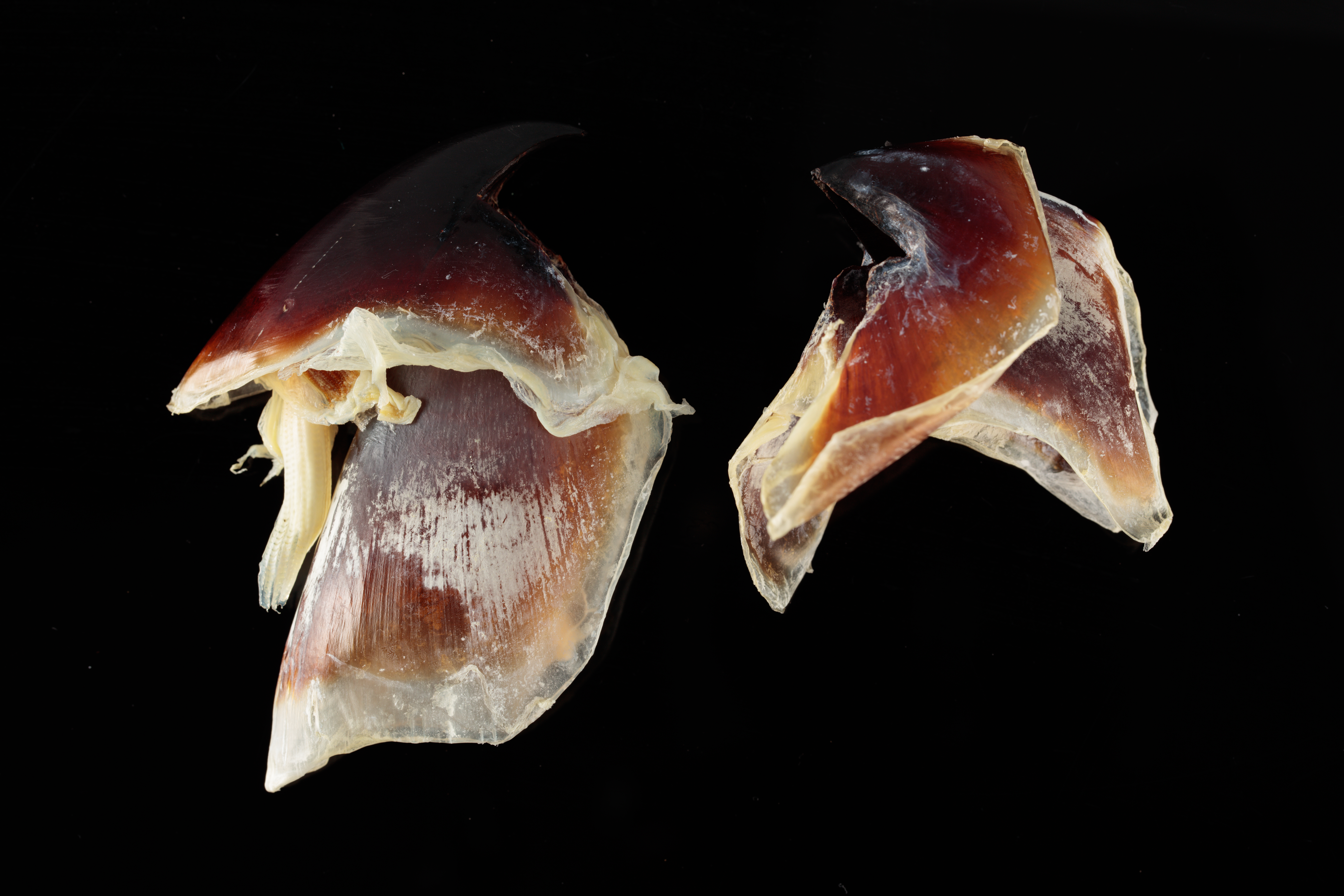
#657 (16/8/2018)
Detail of the same beaks, the upper on the left

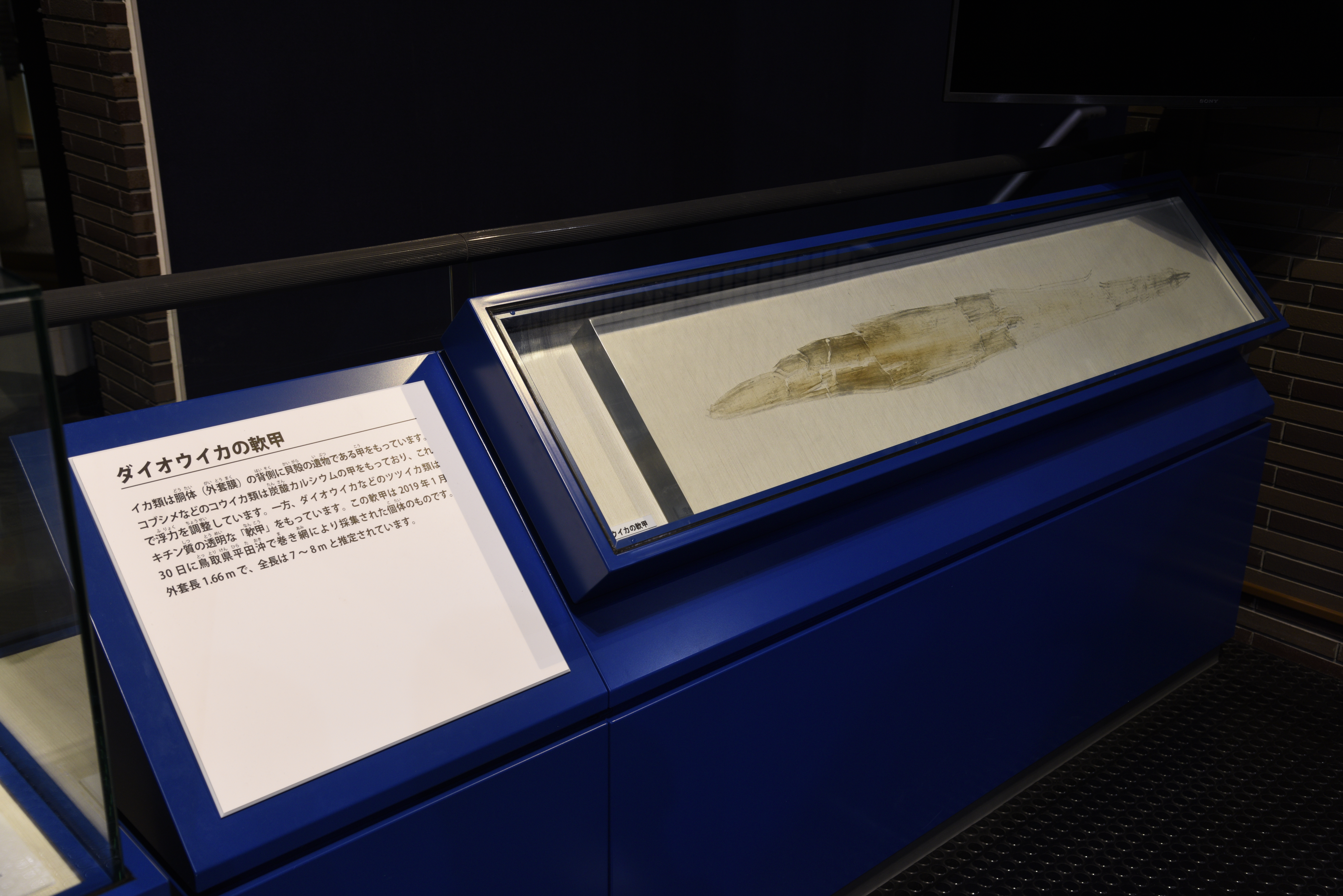
#660 (30/1/2019)
Gladius of giant squid caught off Izumo, Shimane Prefecture, Japan, on 30 January 2019. Displayed at Ibaraki Nature Museum (see also overview of display), which had exhibited a complete, formalin-preserved specimen (#661) prior to a major leak in February 2022 that resulted in the museum's month-long closure.

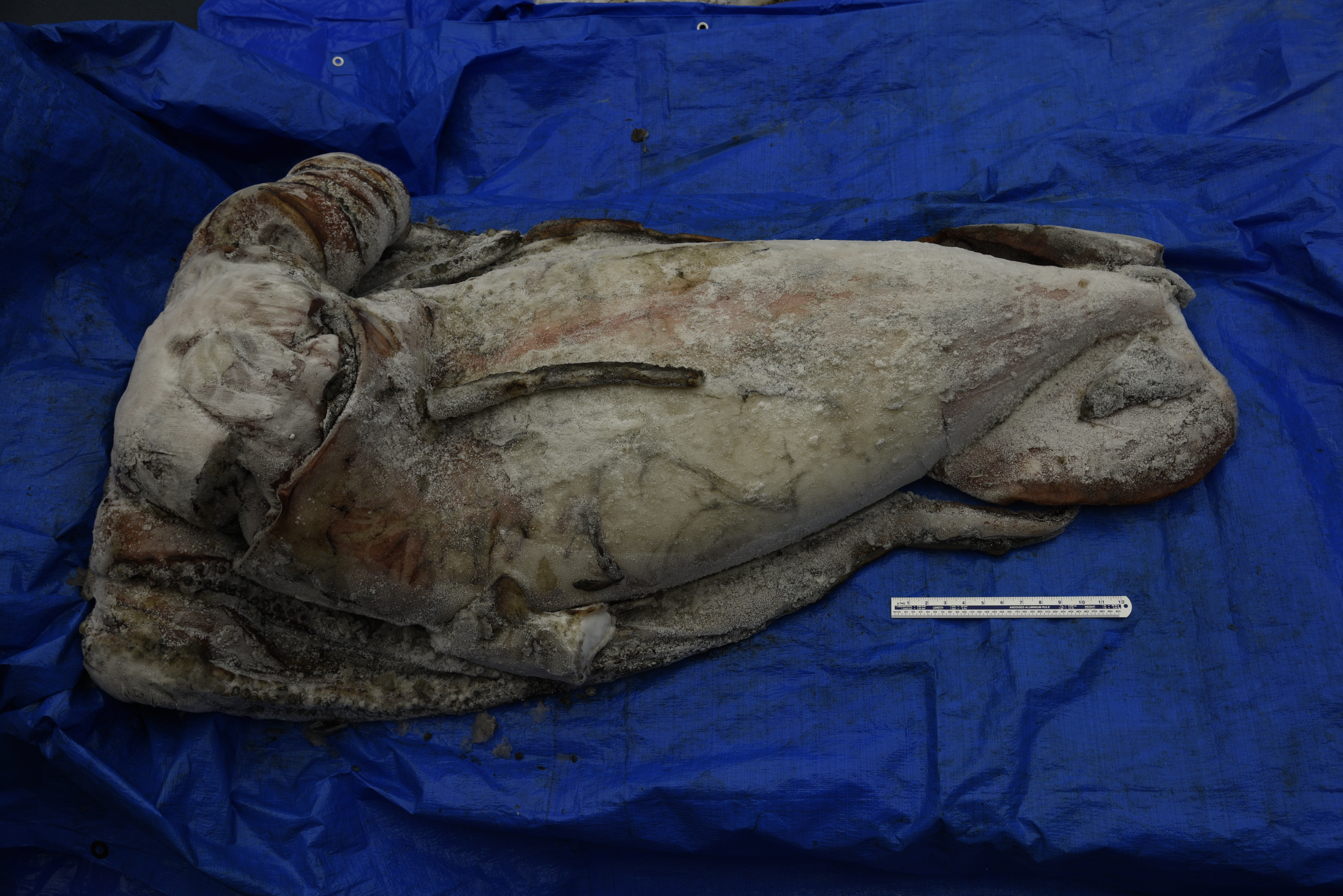
#677 (26/1/2021)
Large specimen found (and filmed) alive at the surface near Izumo, Shimane Prefecture, Japan, on 26 January 2021. Stored frozen at Shimane AQUAS Aquarium (see also oral and lateral views, and with person for scale).

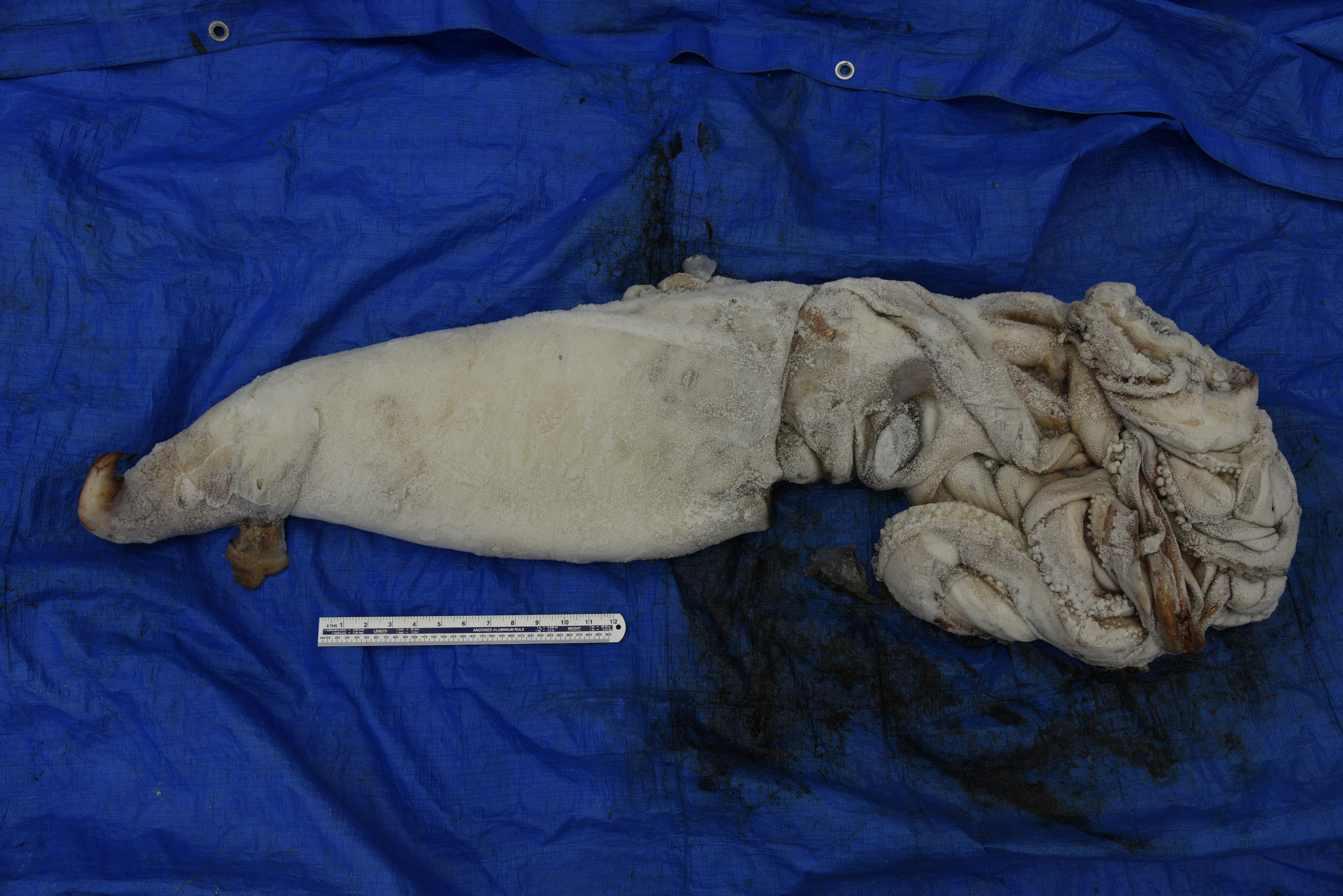
(7/1/2022)
Specimen caught off Izumo, Shimane Prefecture, Japan, on 7 January 2022, stored frozen at Shimane AQUAS Aquarium. It originally measured 4.76 m in total length, 96 cm in mantle length, and weighed 23 kg.

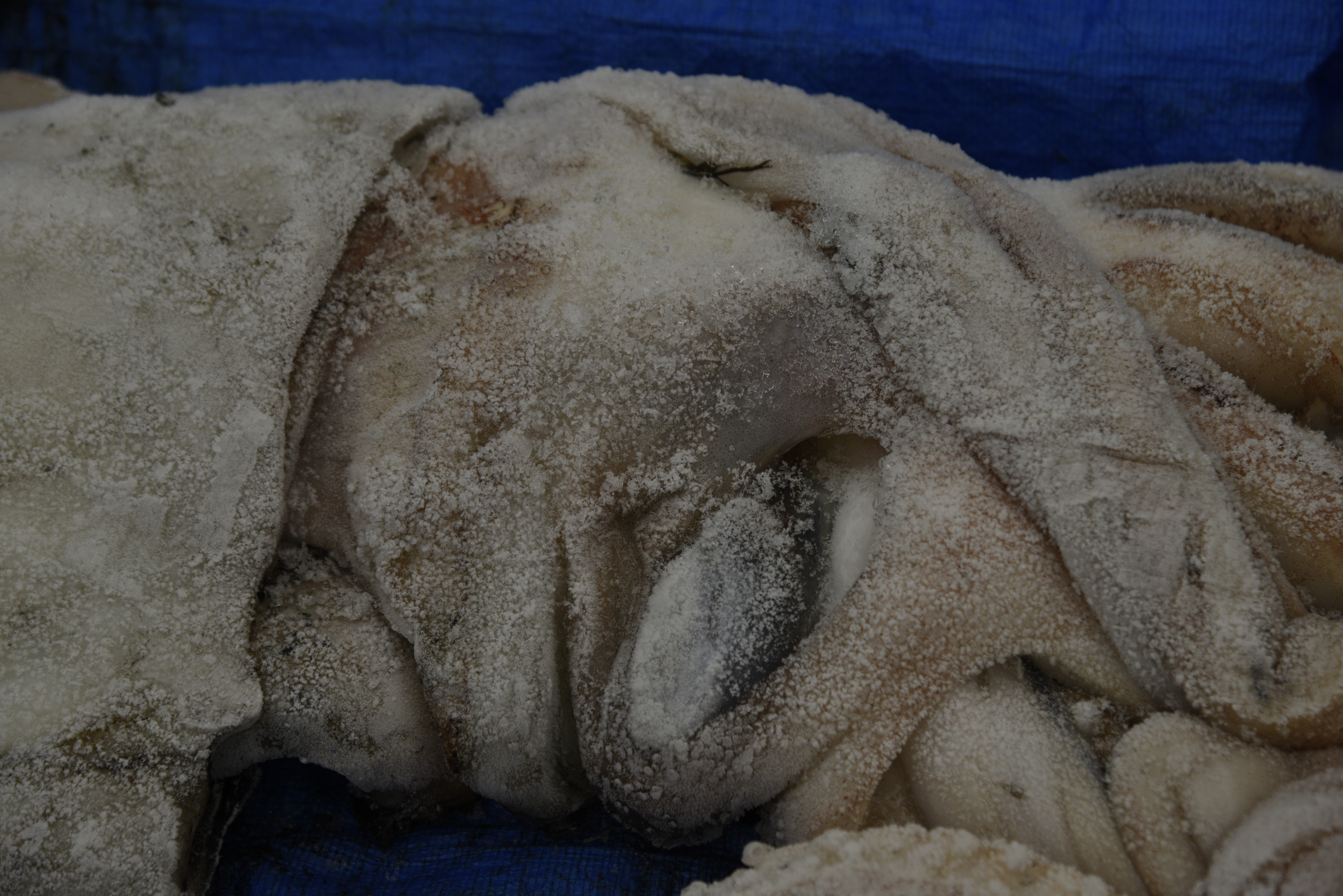
(7/1/2022)
Closeup of head of same specimen, showing the well-preserved eye (see also closeup of arm and tentacle mass)

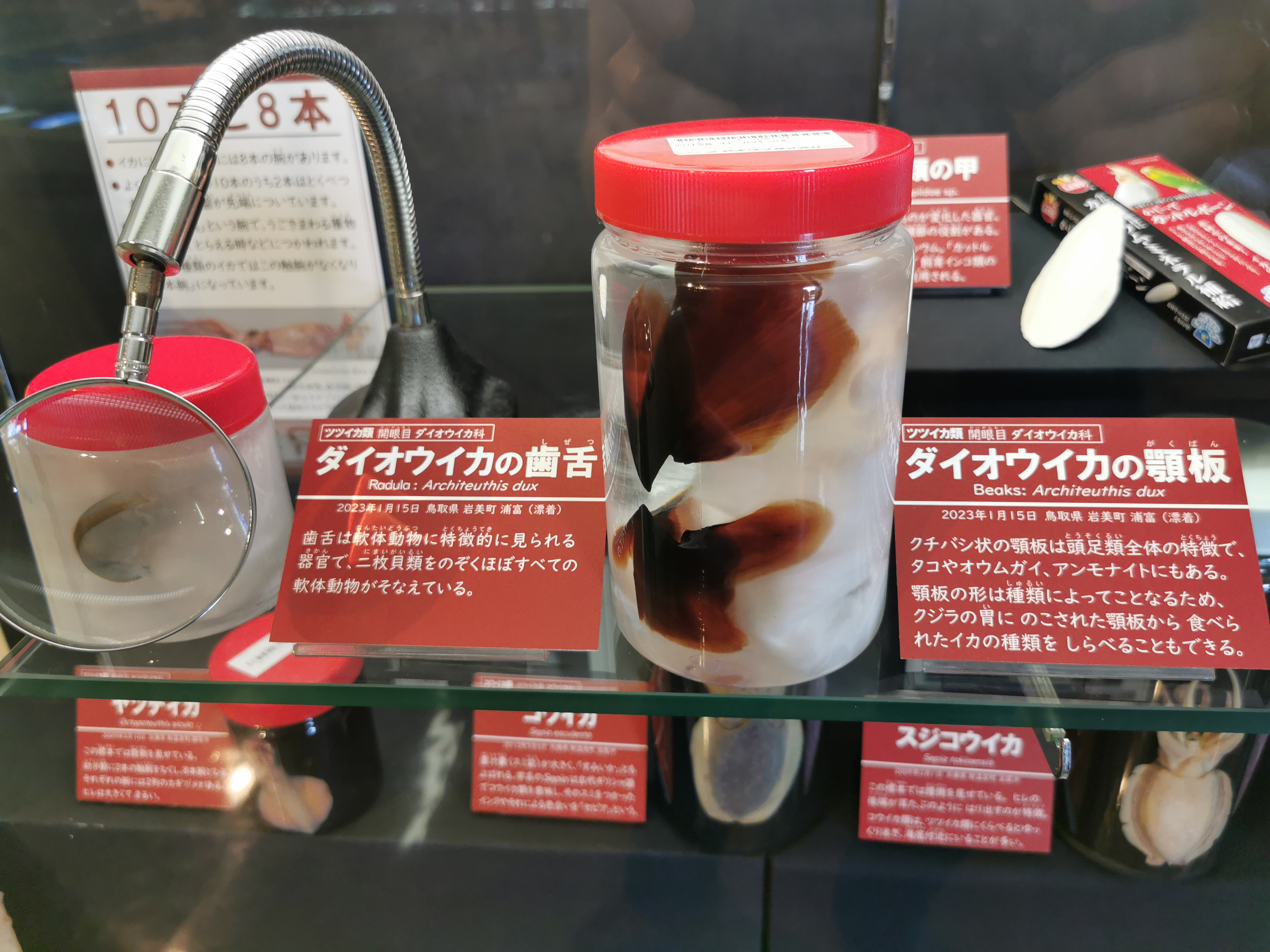
(15/1/2023)
Radula (left) and two-part beak of a giant squid found washed ashore on the Uradome coast of Tottori Prefecture, Japan, on 15 January 2023; part of a temporary display at Tottori Prefectural Museum in May 2023
