= Sumida Aquarium =

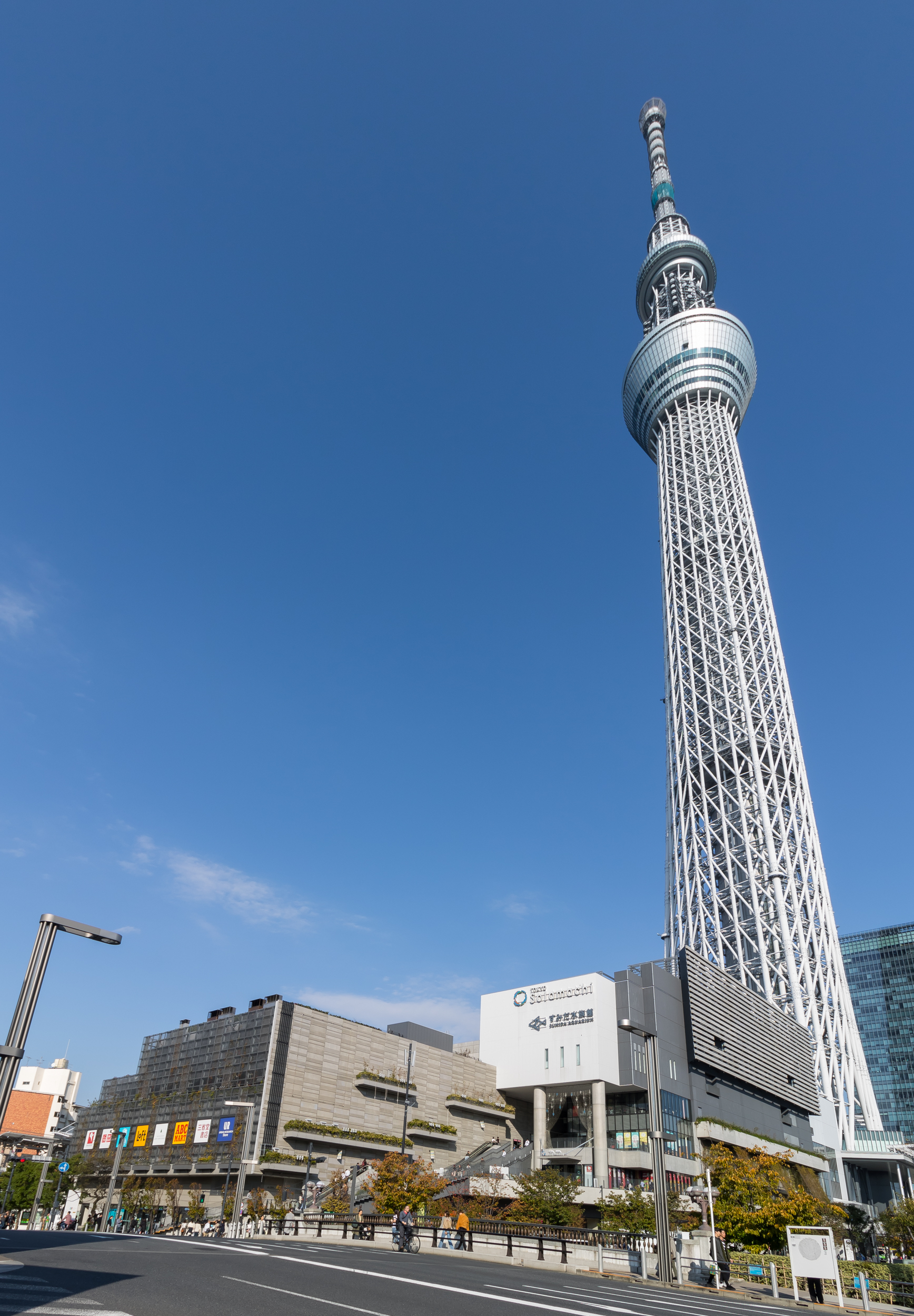
- Tokyo Skytree and Sumida Aquarium
- Interactive map of Sumida Aquarium
- Date opened: 22 May 2012
- Location: Sumida, Tokyo, Japan
- No. of animals: 7,000
- No. of species: 260
- Total volume of tanks: 700,000 litres (185,000 US gal)
- Annual visitors: 1.4 million (2018)
- Memberships: JAZA
- Major exhibits: Ogasawara Sea tank Penguins and fur seal pool
- Management: Orix
- Website: www.sumida-aquarium.com/en/index.html

Sumida Aquarium (ja:すみだ水族館, Sumida Suizokukan) is a public aquarium located on the 5th and 6th floors of the Tokyo Skytree in Sumida, Tokyo. It opened in 2012 at the same time as Tokyo Skytree itself. It is managed by Orix real estate corporation.

== Exhibits ==
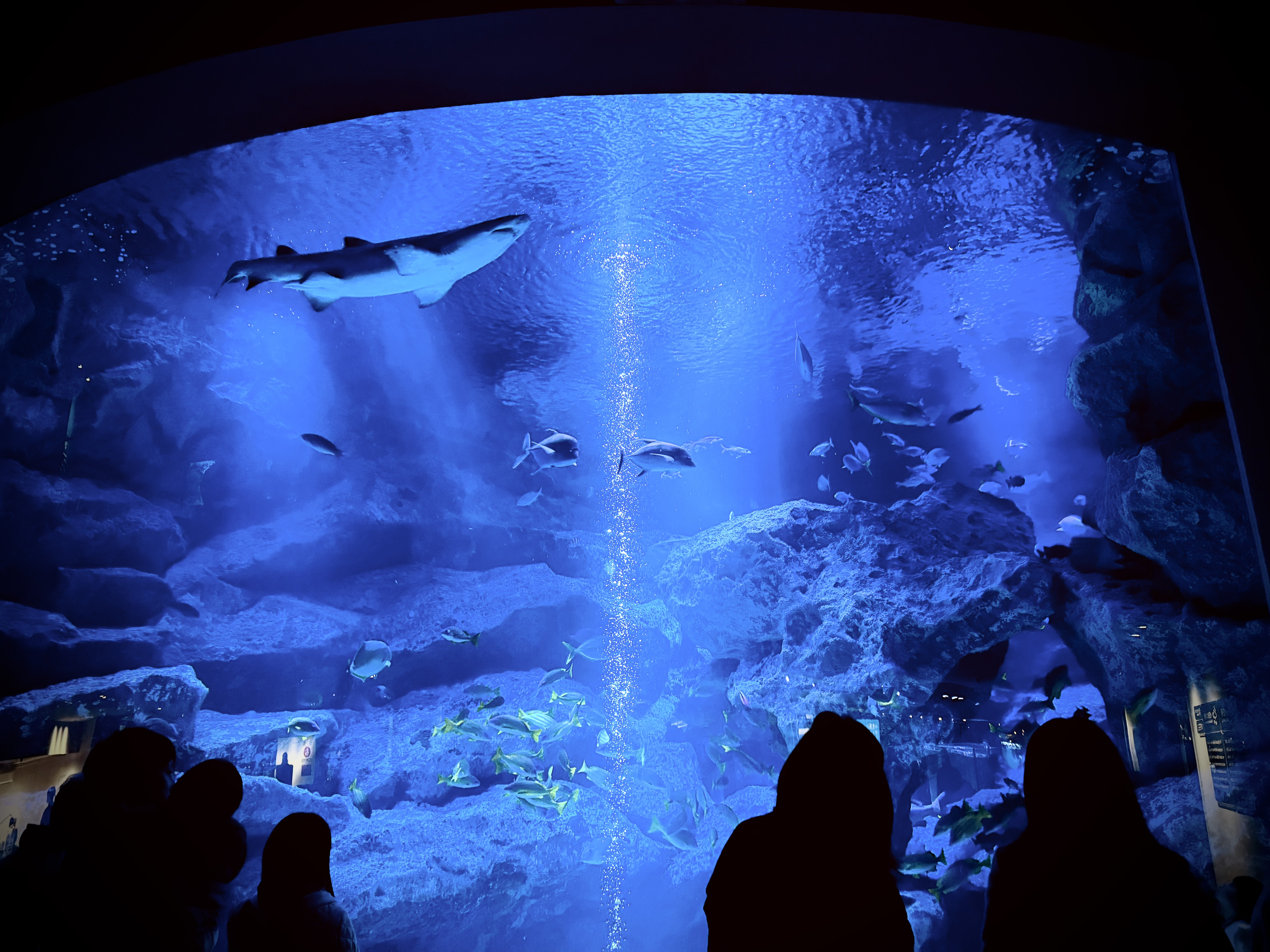
Ogasawara Sea tank

According to the aquarium's website, the aquarium uses artificial seawater in all of their tanks, making it easier to sustain the aquarium year-round and removing the costly requirement to transport natural seawater inland. This is done using a seawater production system developed by Nagaoka University of Technology and Taisei Corporation.

The Ogasawara Sea Tank is a tank 6 metres (20 ft) deep designed to represent the ocean around the Ogasawara Islands, a World Natural Heritage site. The aquarium worked with the village of Ogasawara to create the exhibit, and more than 50 different species of fish, including sand tiger sharks, were transported from the islands.

At the time of its opening, the aquarium displayed a tank of 634 spotted garden eels, representing the 634 metres of the Tokyo Sky Tree. Later, gorgasia and whitespotted garden eels were added to the exhibit.

The penguin pool in the atrium is 24 metres (79 ft) wide and 14 metres (46 ft) deep, making it one of the largest indoor penguin pools in Japan. It is home to around 50 Magellanic penguins.

The Edorium exhibits goldfish, and is designed with an Edo theme. Following renovations in 2016, the Edorium is now one of the largest goldfish exhibits in Japan. Tanks 100 metres (330 ft) long exhibit about 1,000 goldfish of over 20 varieties.

== Gallery ==
Exterior

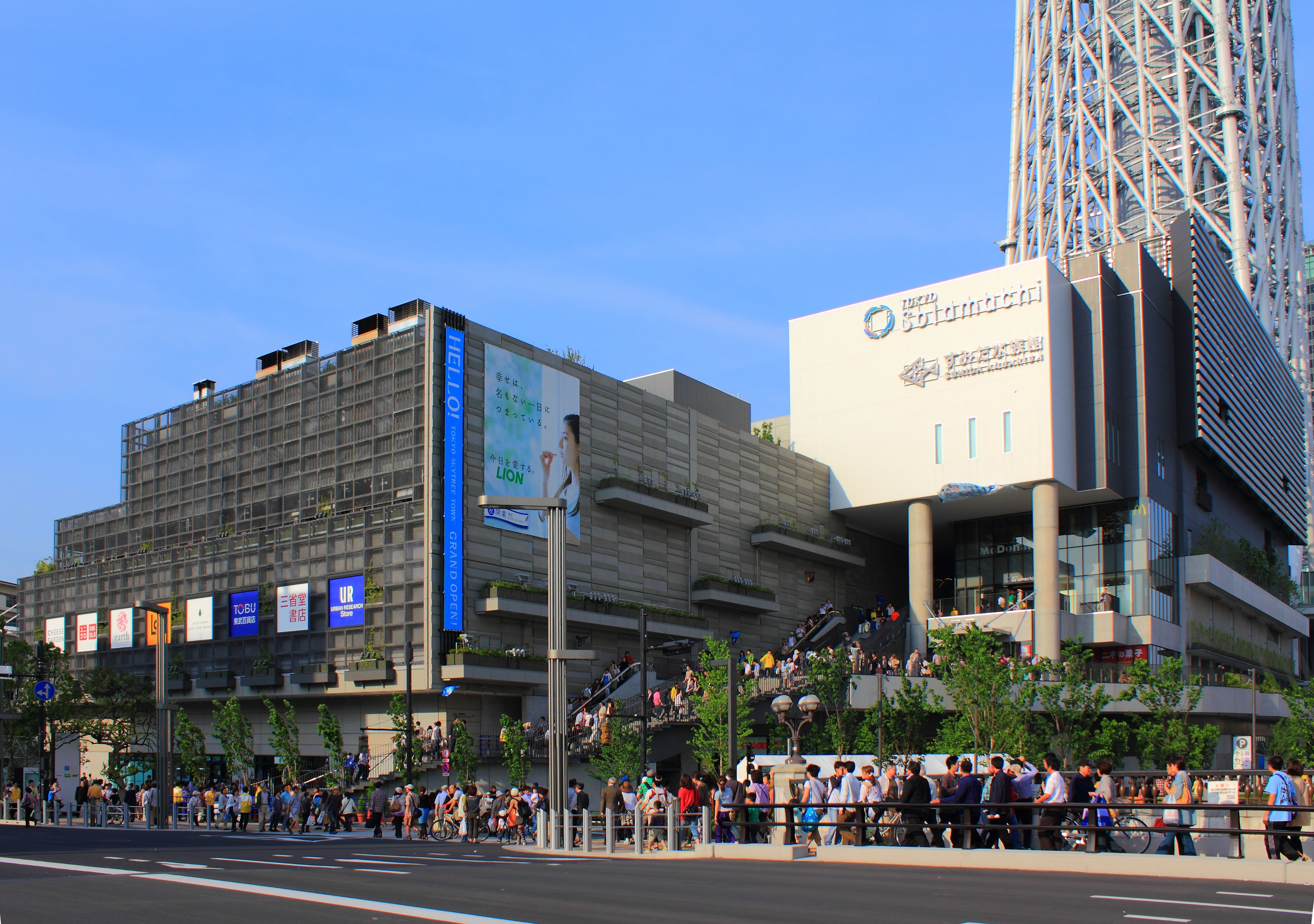

Exhibits

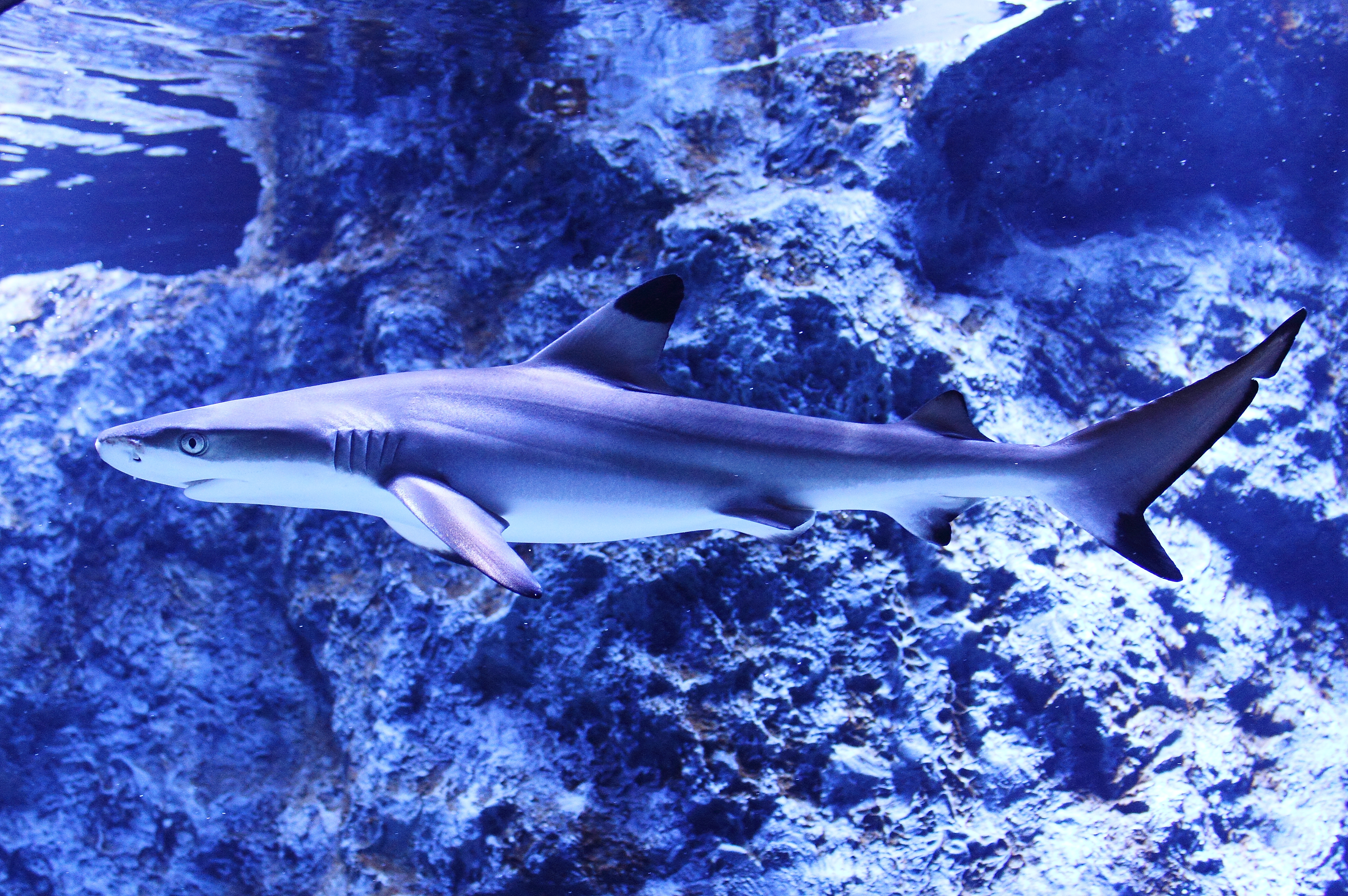

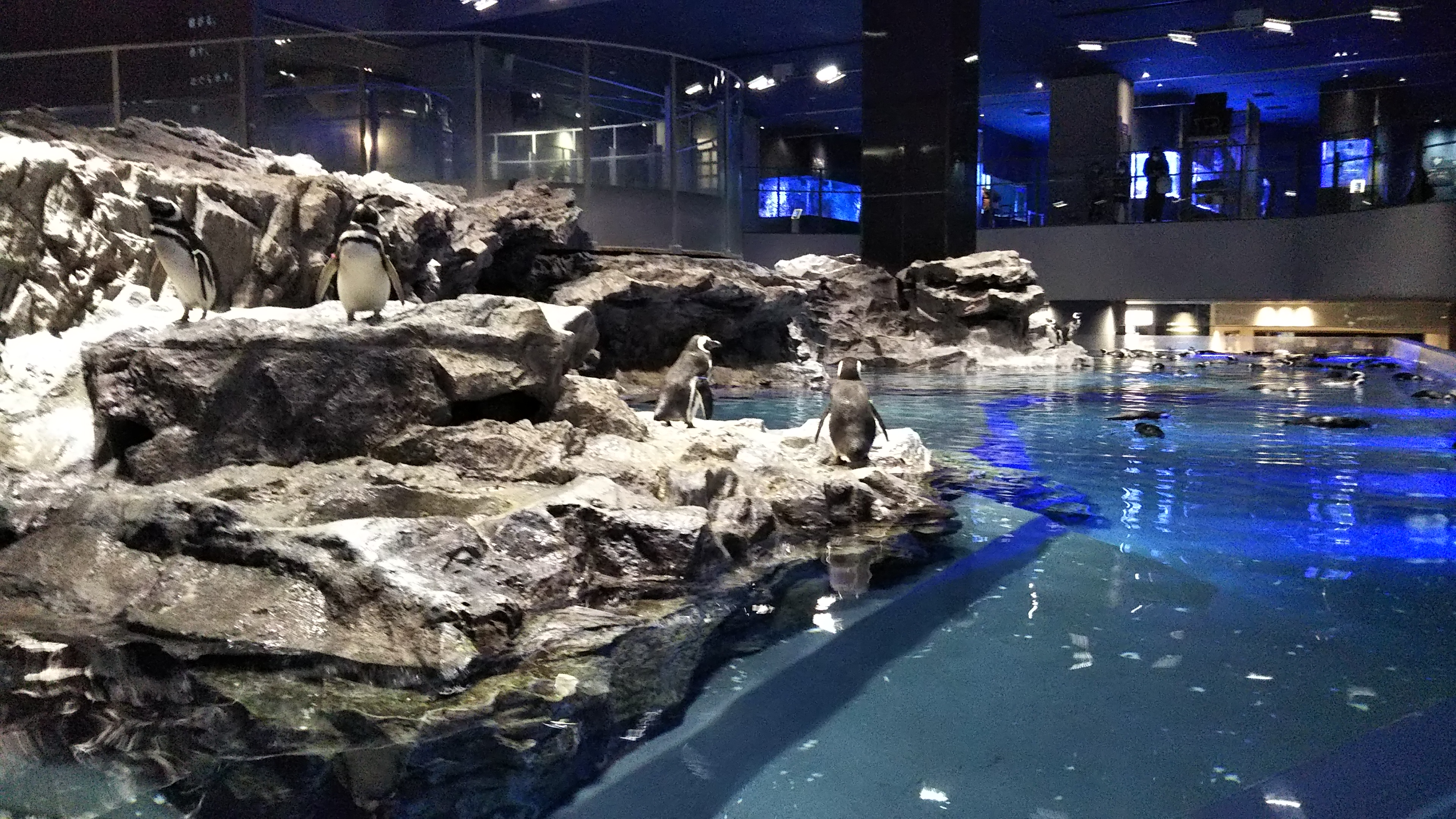

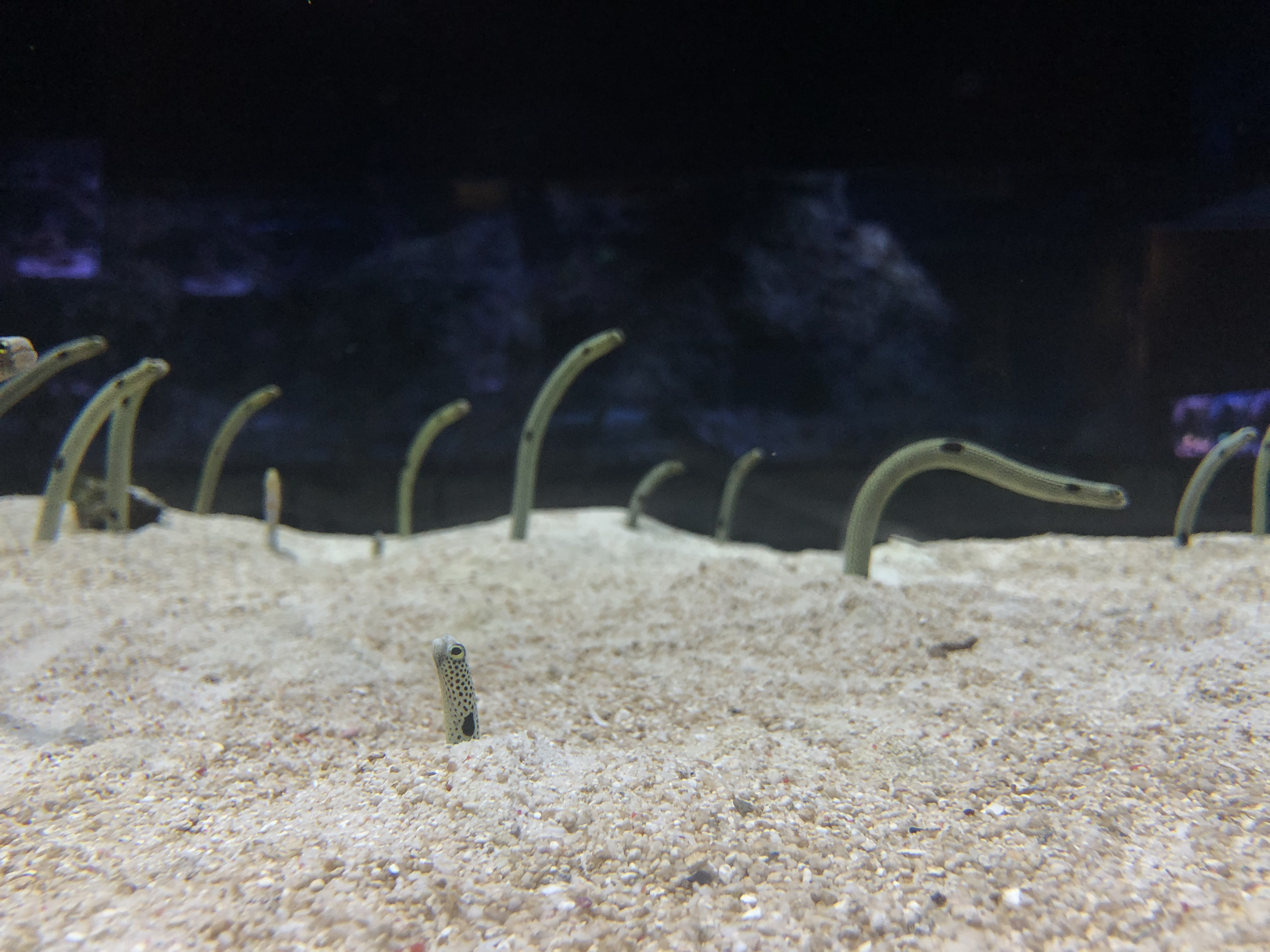

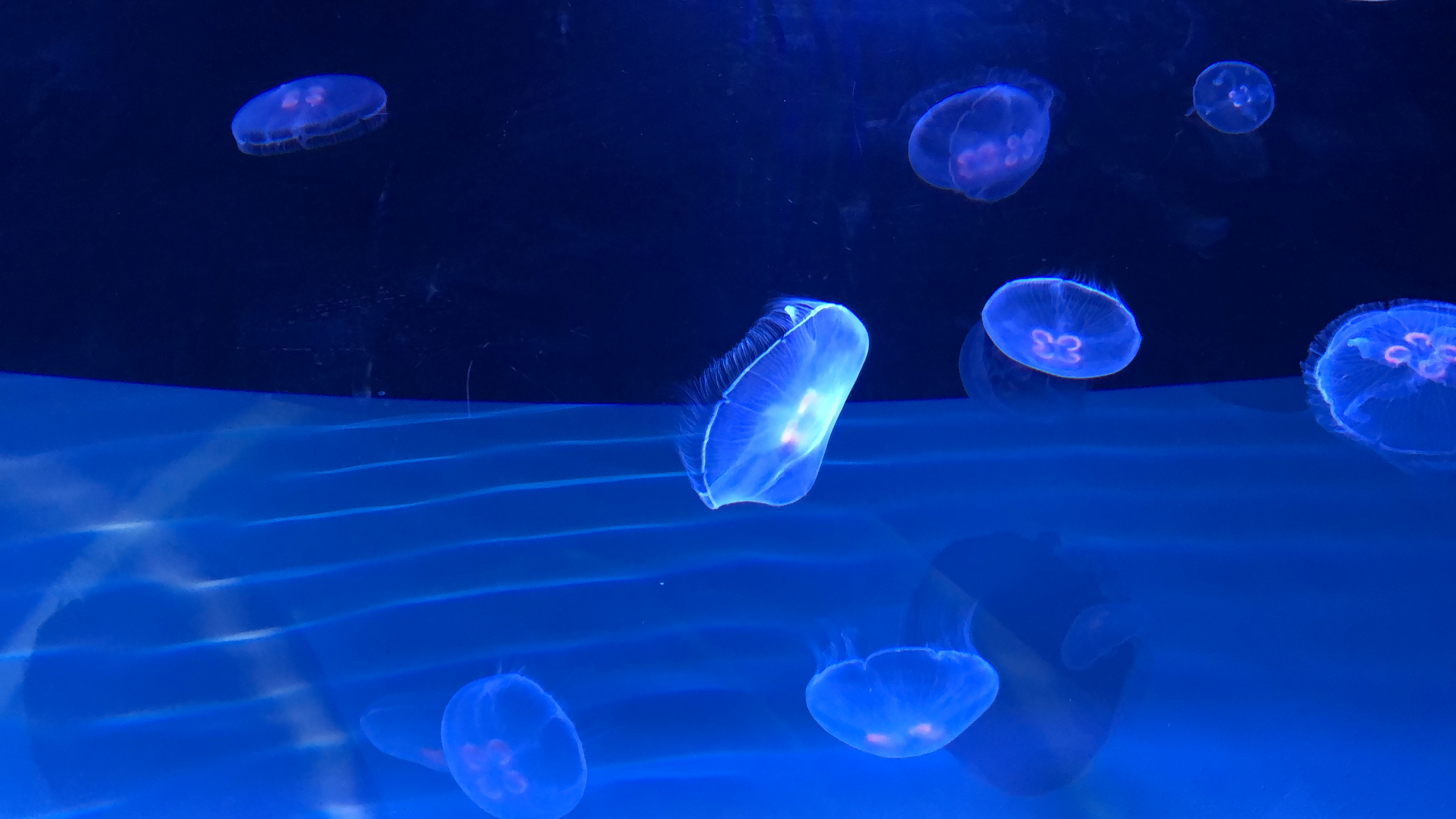

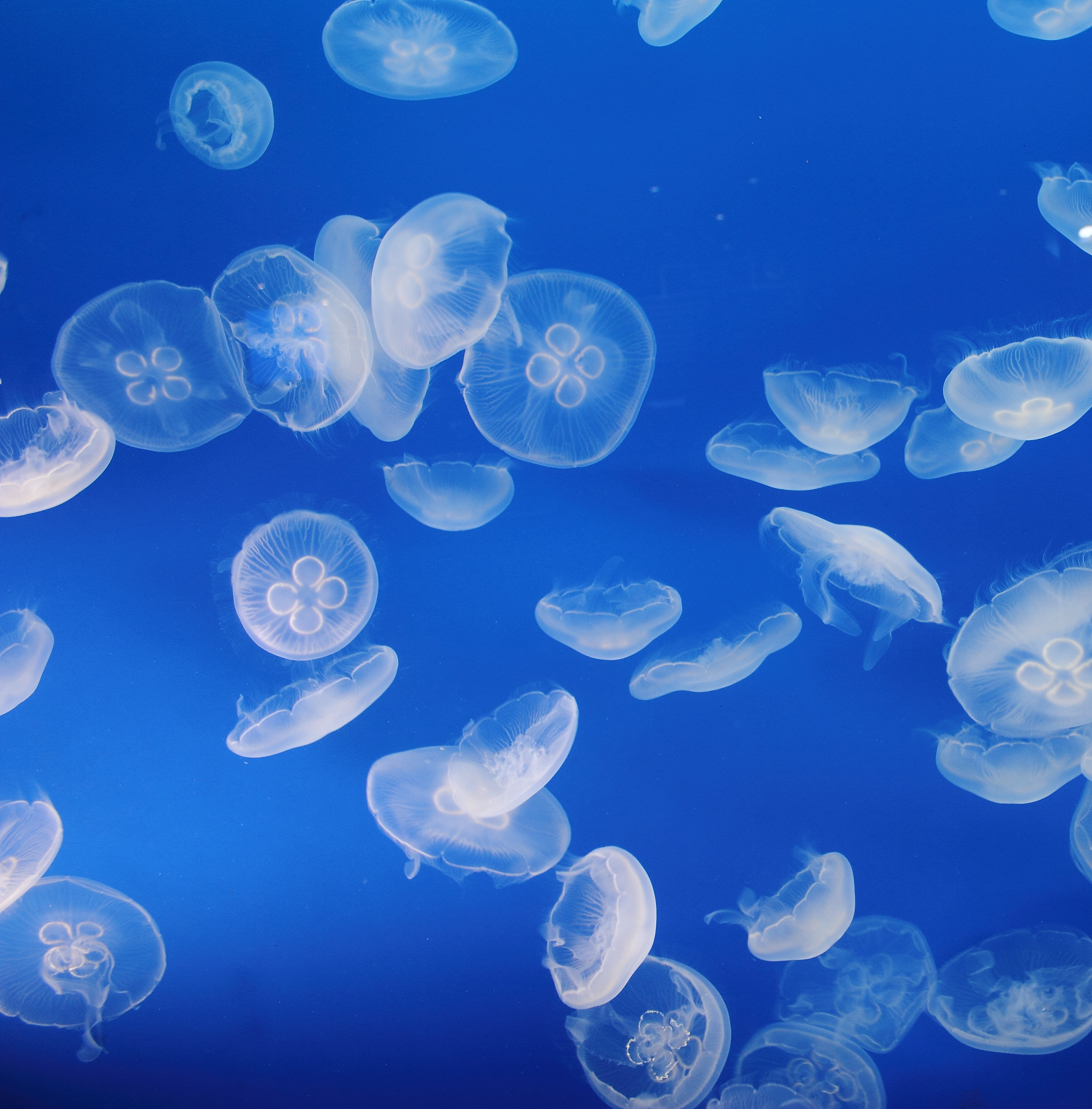

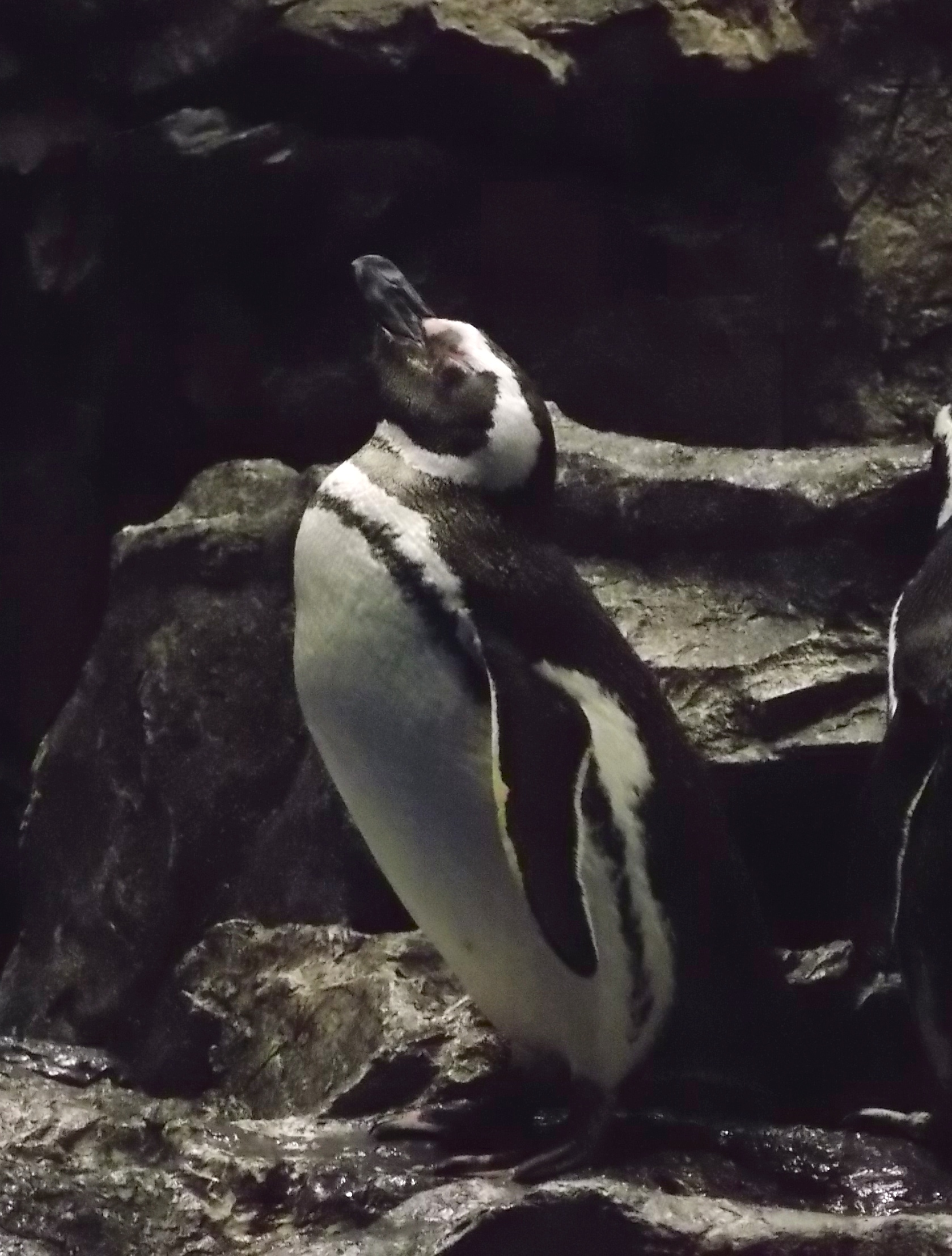

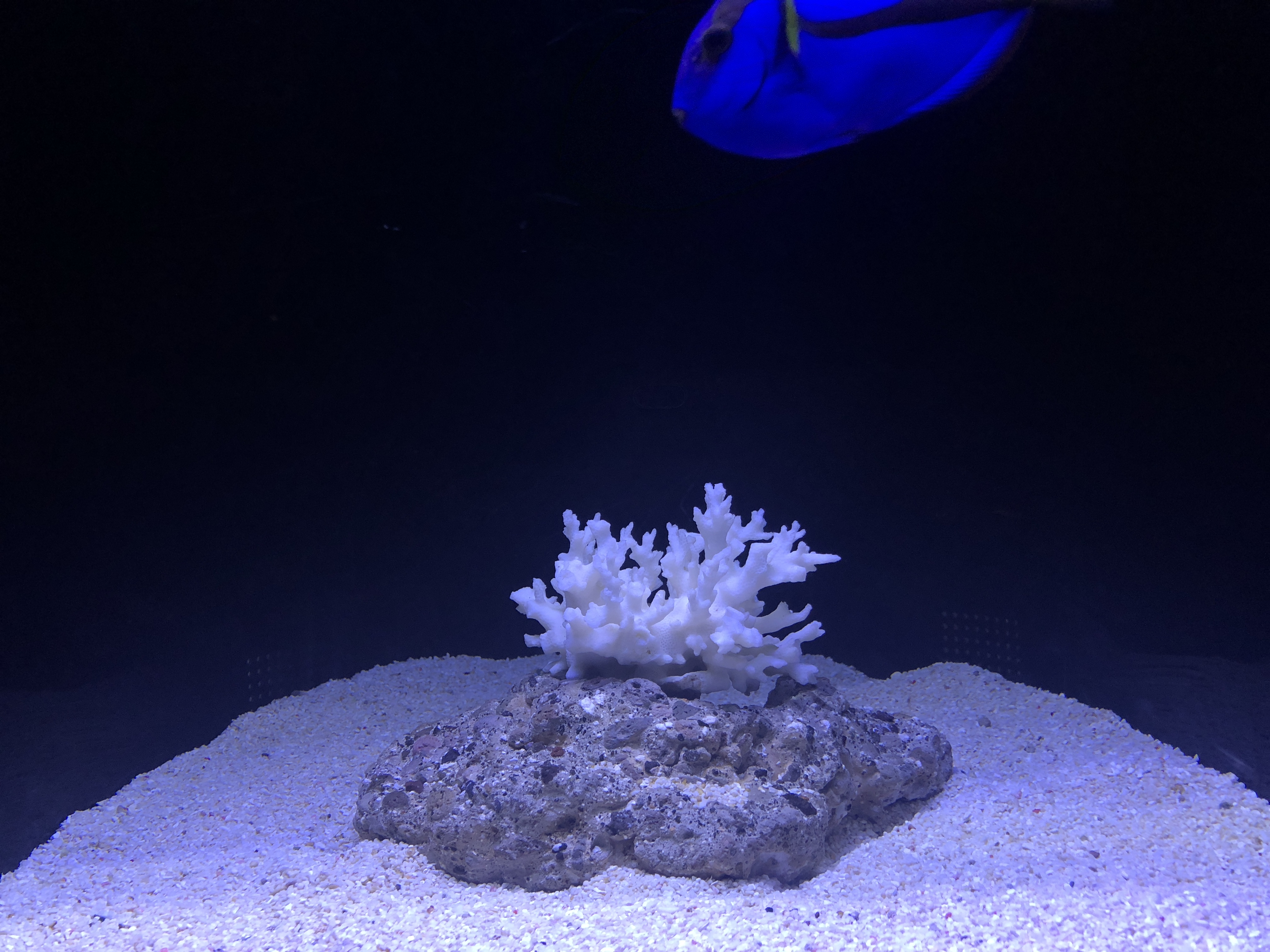

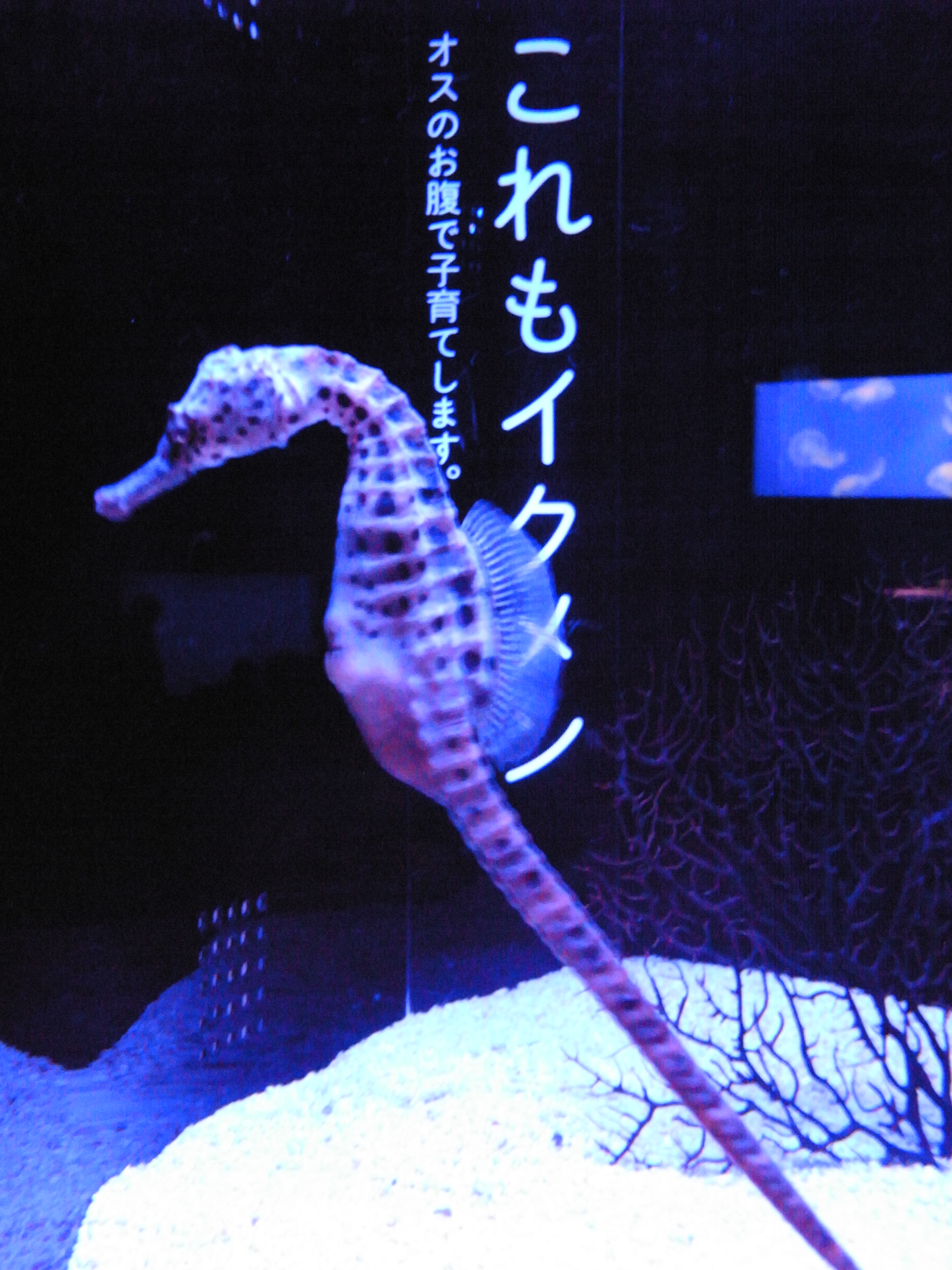

== See also ==
- Tokyo Skytree Station
- Kyoto Aquarium (same management)
