= Kyoto Aquarium =

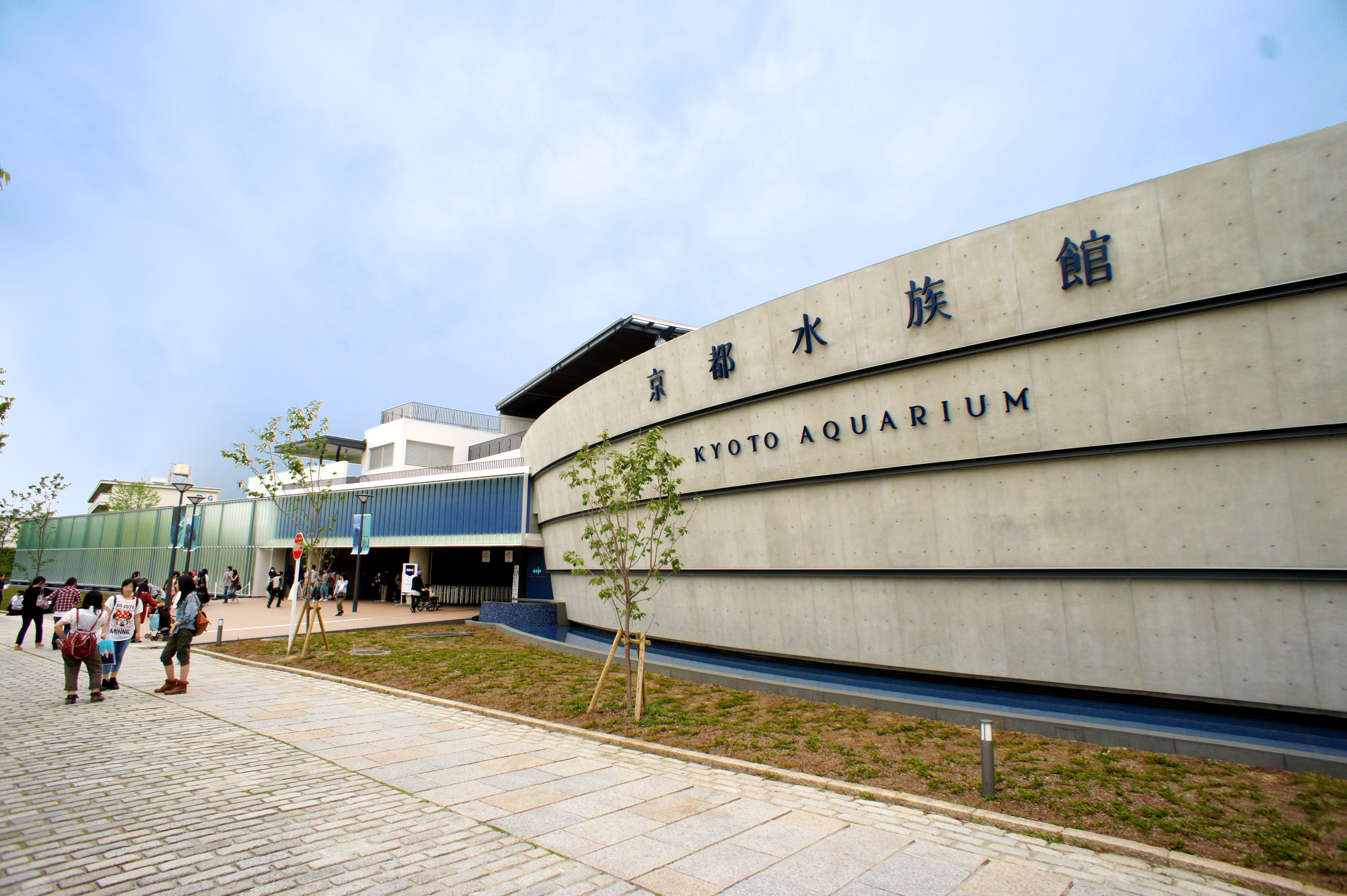
- Front entrance
- Interactive map of Kyoto Aquarium
- 34°59′15.2″N 135°44′51.4″E
- Date opened: March 2012
- Location: Kyoto City, Kyoto Prefecture, Japan
- Land area: 10,974 m^{2} (118,120 sq ft)
- No. of animals: 15,000
- Total volume of tanks: 3 million litres (790,000 US gal)
- Memberships: JAZA
- Management: Orix
- Website: www.kyoto-aquarium.com/index.html

Kyoto Aquarium (京都水族館) is an aquarium located in Umekoji Park in Kyoto City, Kyoto Prefecture's Shimogyo Ward, Japan.

== History ==
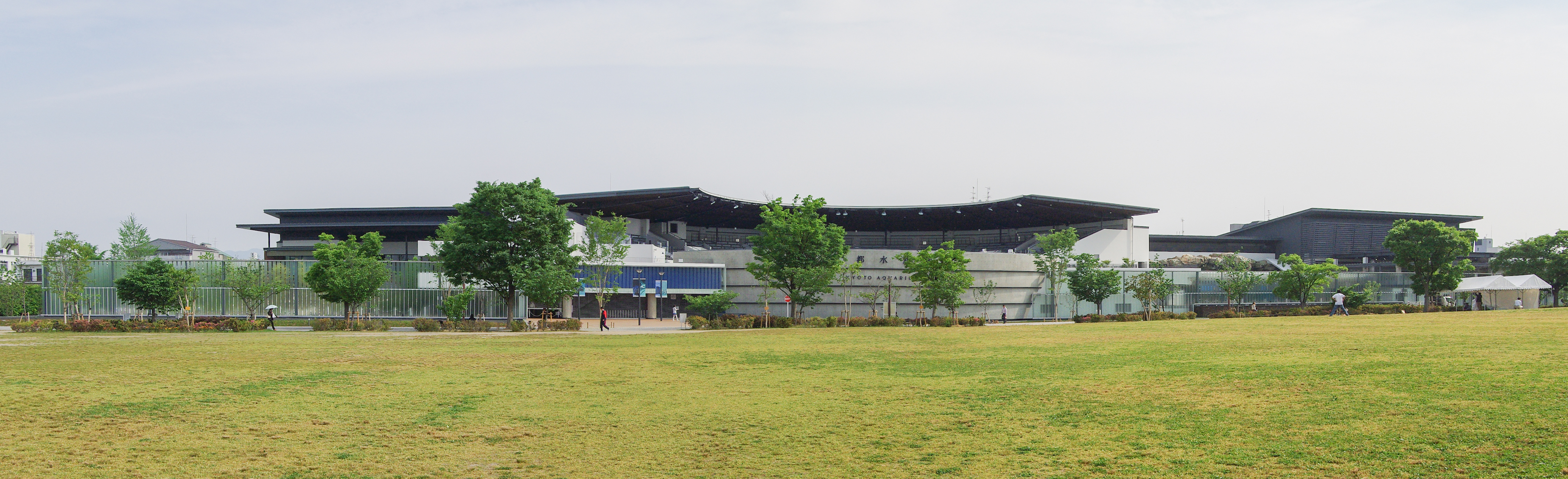
Whole building from the exterior

Opened on March 14, 2012 (Heisei 24), it is an inland aquarium and the first aquarium in Japan to completely use artificial seawater.

It is also one of the largest inland aquariums in Japan. It is one of the core facilities of Umekoji Park near Kyoto Station, and is managed by Orix Real Estate Corporation, which leases part of the park and adjacent land from the city of Kyoto.

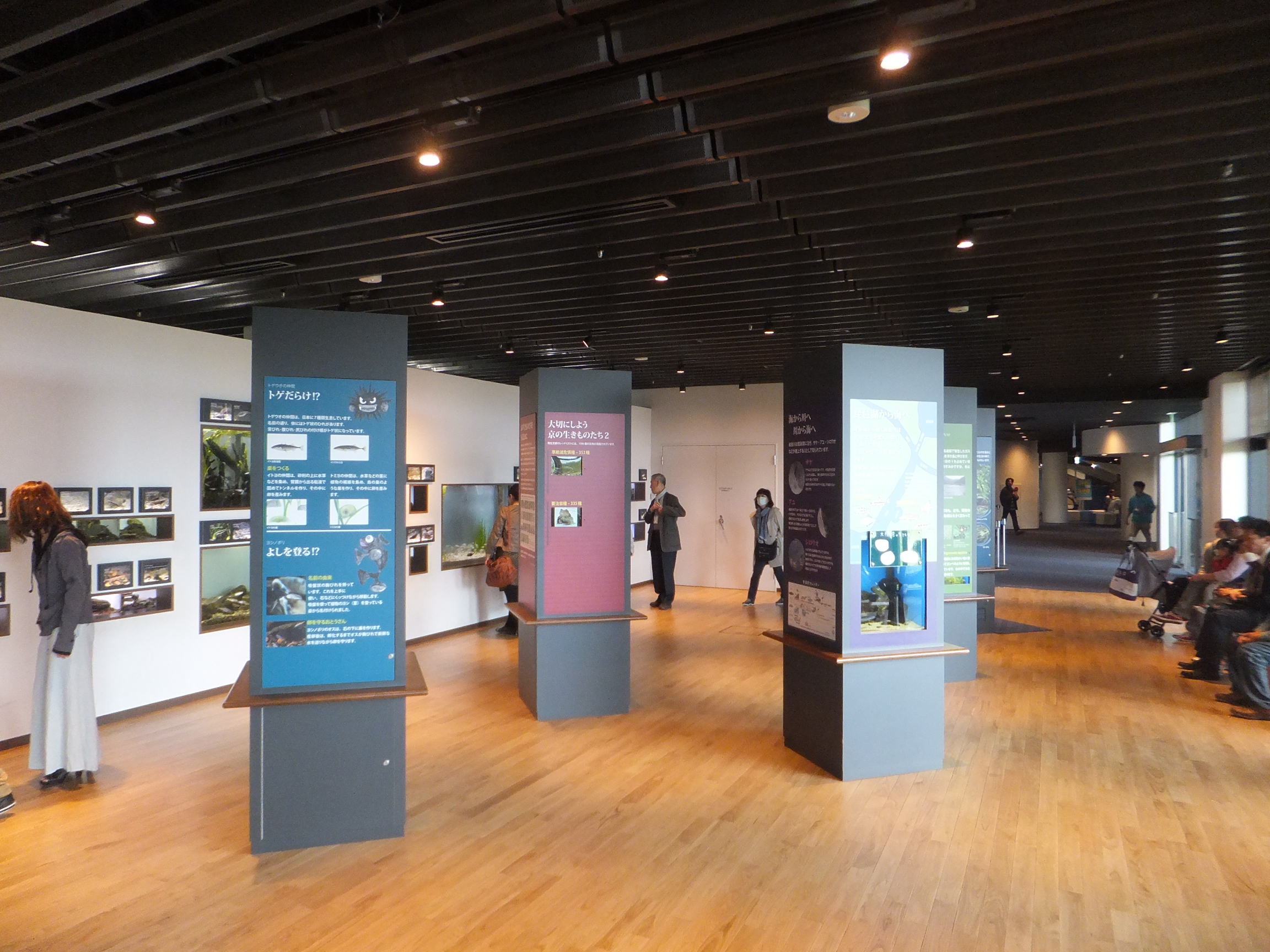
Interior of the aquarium, showcasing an exhibit in 2013

ORIX Facilities Corporation, a building management company within the DAIKYO Group, will provide general management services, while ORIX Aquarium Corporation will operate the aquarium. The amount of seawater required, which accounts for approximately 90% of the total water volume, will be provided entirely by artificial seawater produced by Taisei Corporation's high-performance filtration system, which designed and constructed the aquarium. The building will have three stories above ground and one story in the tower, with a total building area of 5,948.25 m^{2}, a total floor area of 10,974.29 m^{2}, and a maximum capacity of 5,000 people. The construction cost is approximately ¥6,000,000,000 (total investment not disclosed). The goal is to attract 2 million visitors in the first year.

== Penguin relationships ==
The Kyoto Aquarium house penguins, which are generally monogamous, and staff are able to observe their relationships, noting behavior such as wing-flapping and mutual grooming as signs of affection.

In 2018, the Kyoto Aquarium's X social media account shared an image of a penguin relationship diagram that went viral. The diagram contains information about five main relationships among the penguins: couples and lovers (shown with a heart symbol and red line), failed relationships (shown with broken hearts and blue line), complicated relationships (shown with a question mark with hearts and purple line), basic friendships (shown with a yellow line), and enemies (shown with a green line). The chart also includes personality descriptions, pictures, and names of each penguin.

For example, from the chart it can be seen that Tera is Kyoto Aquarium’s popular female penguin, with failed relationships with six penguins’ in the 2019. Moreover, Tera was observed to have a relationship with Orre (who according to the map is a "control freak"), but also has romantic interests with Same and Shijyou.

The Sumida Aquarium has created a similar penguin relationship chart for their penguins.

== Gallery ==
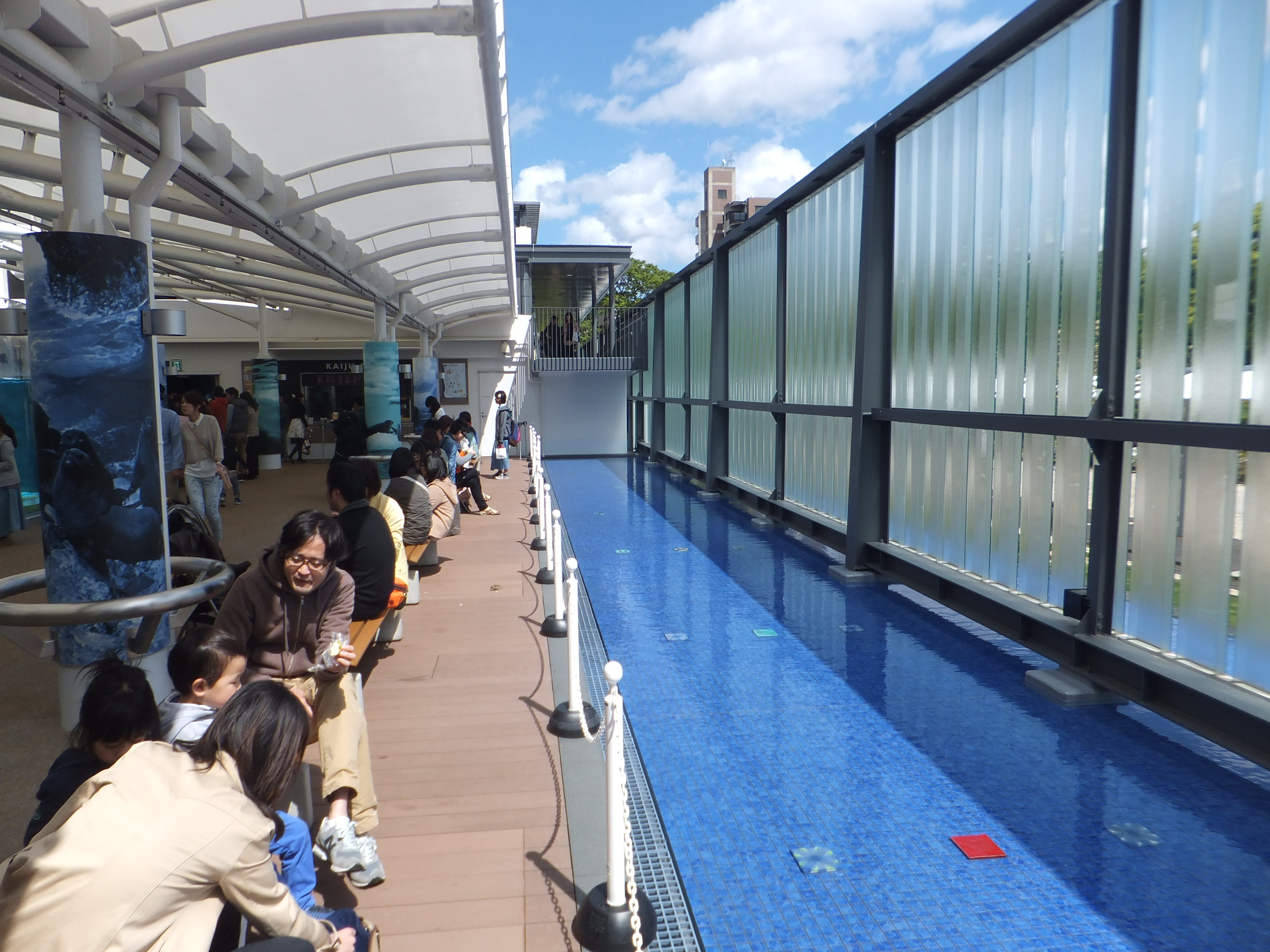

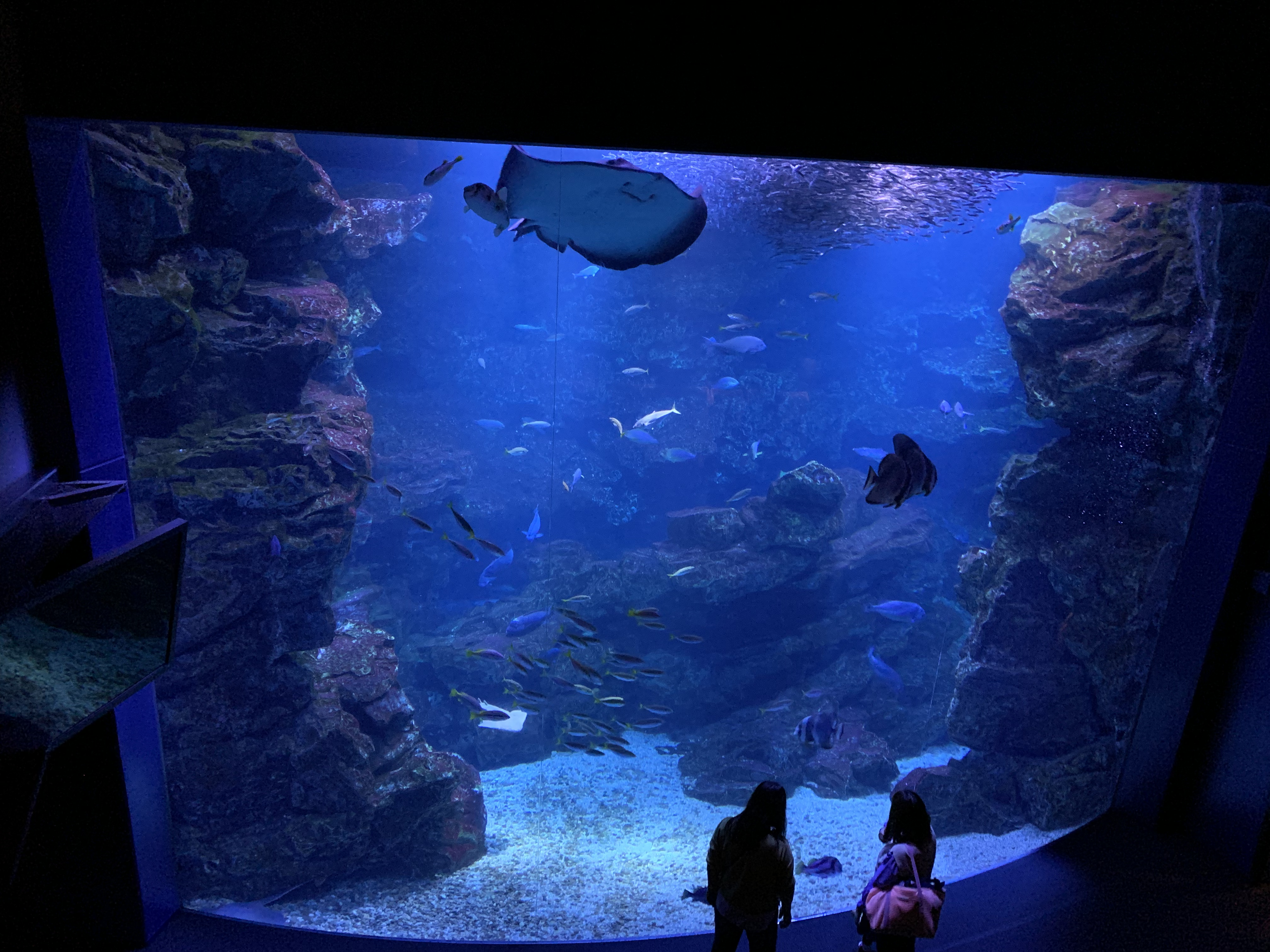

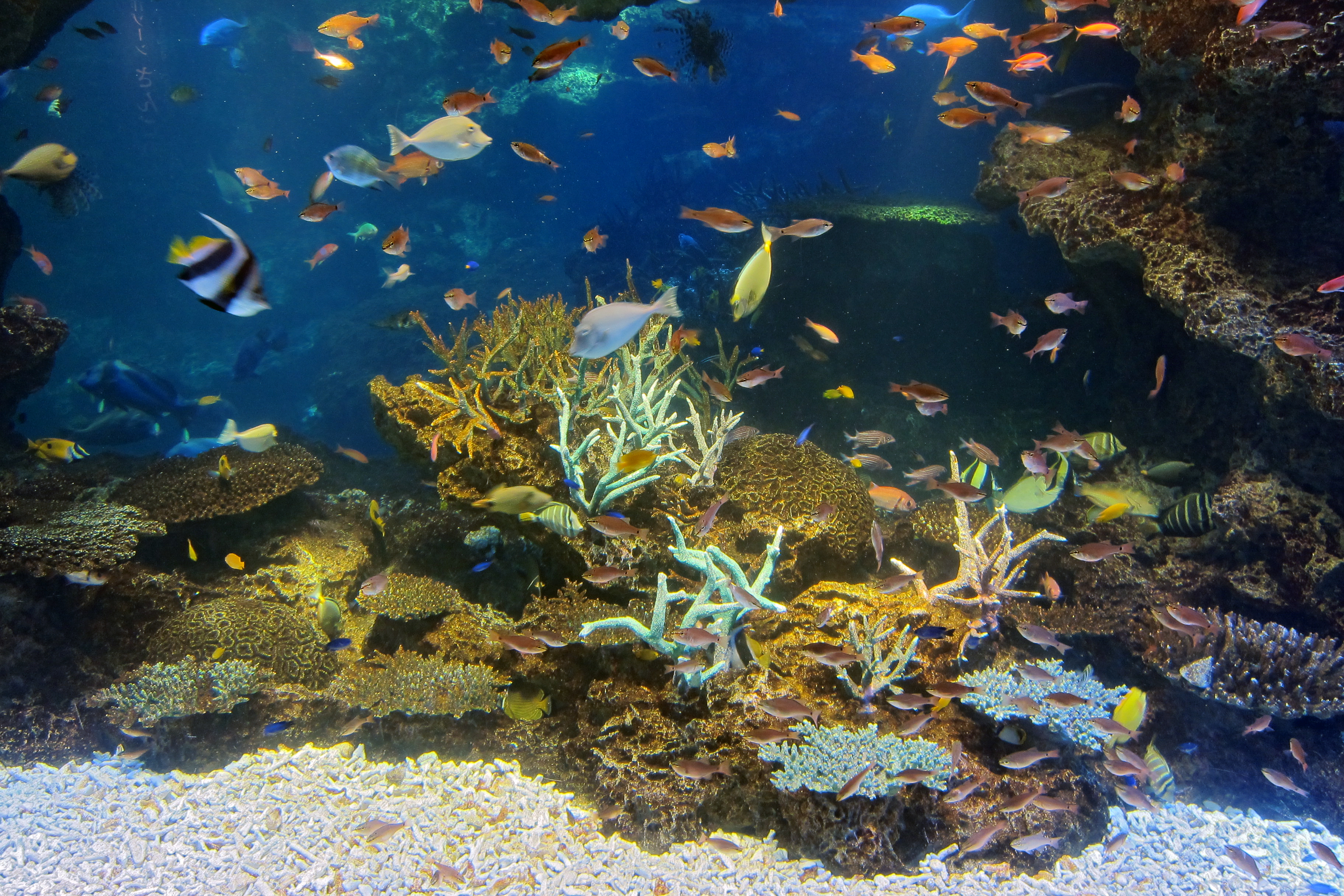

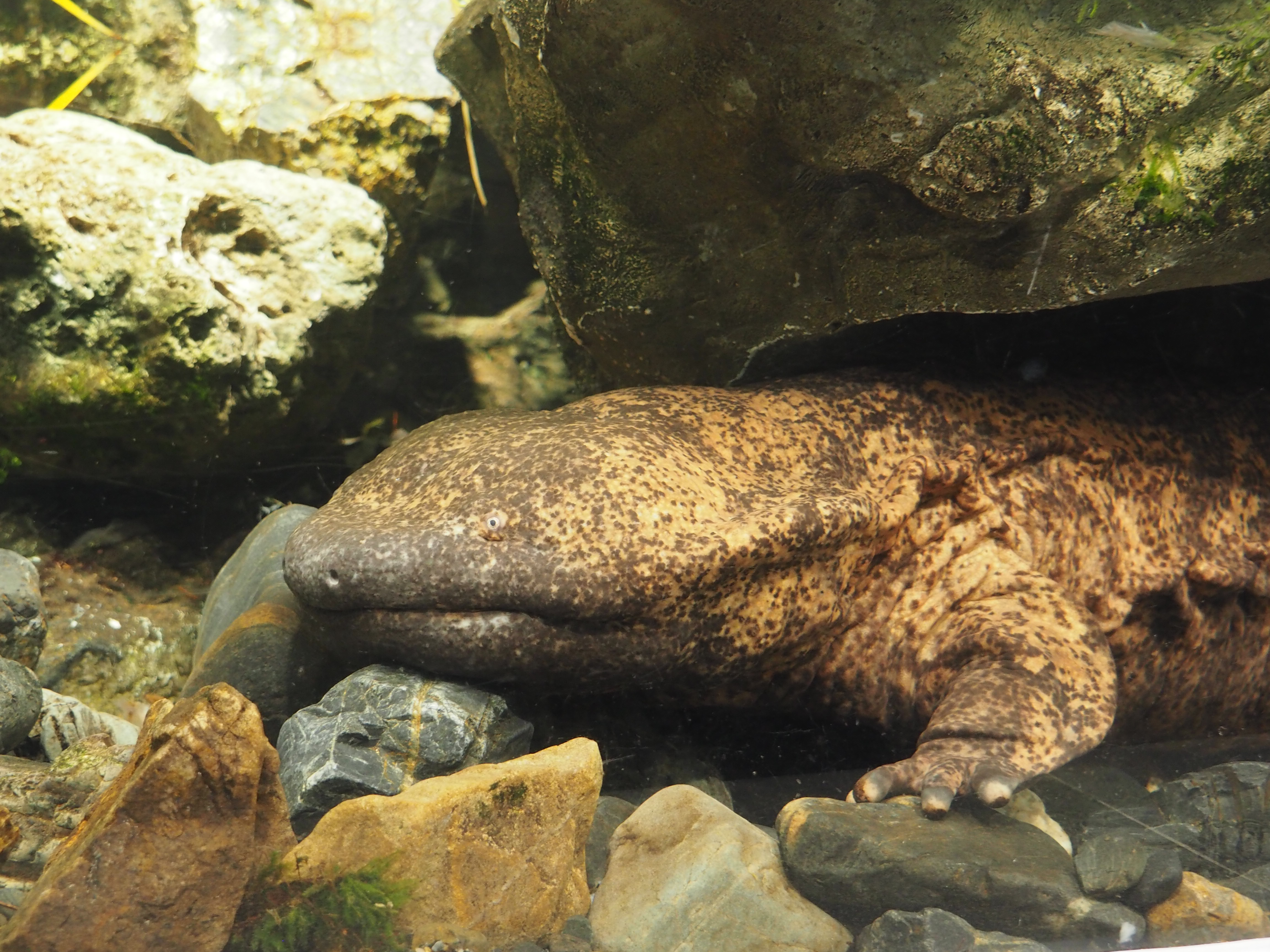

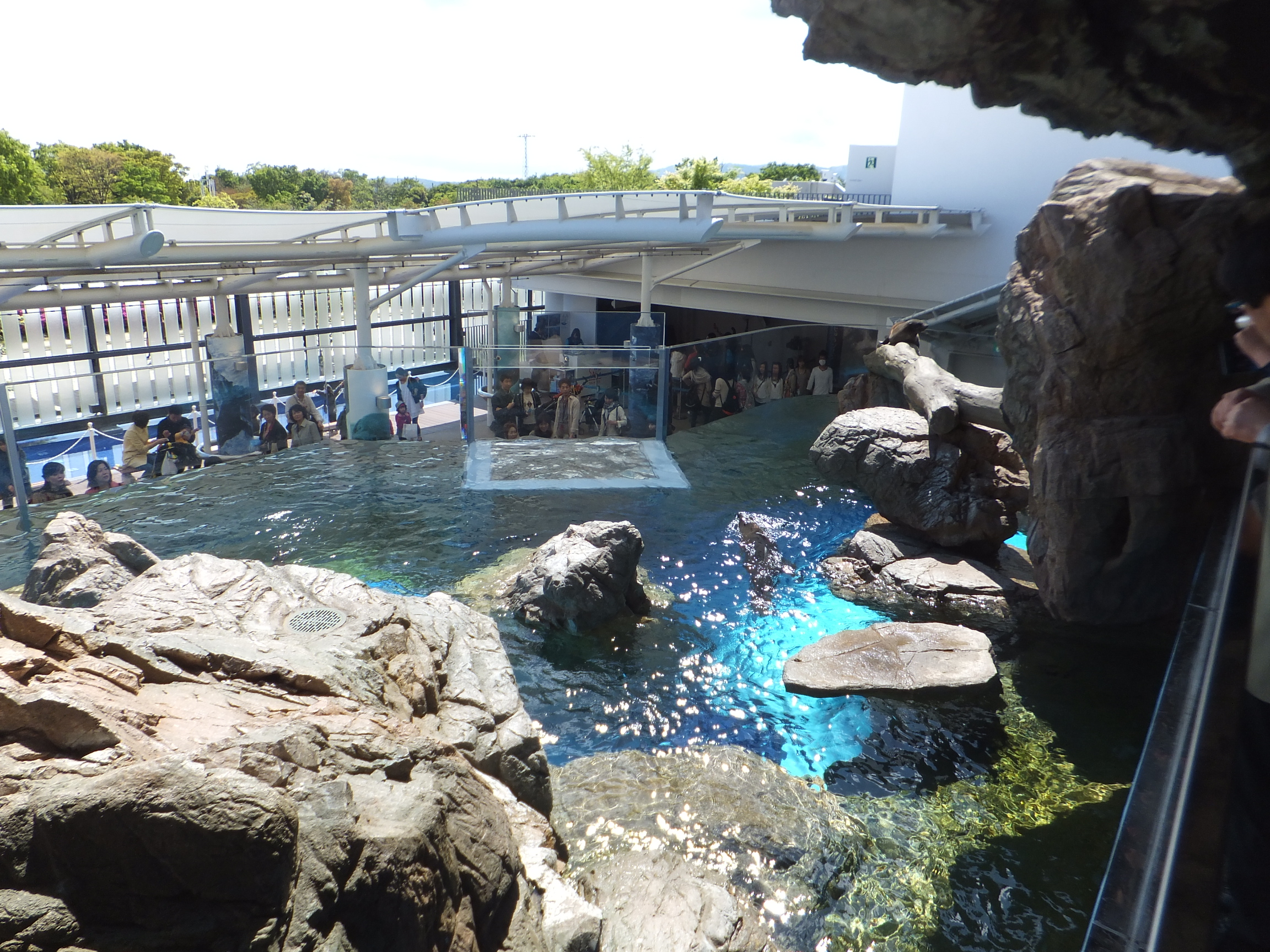

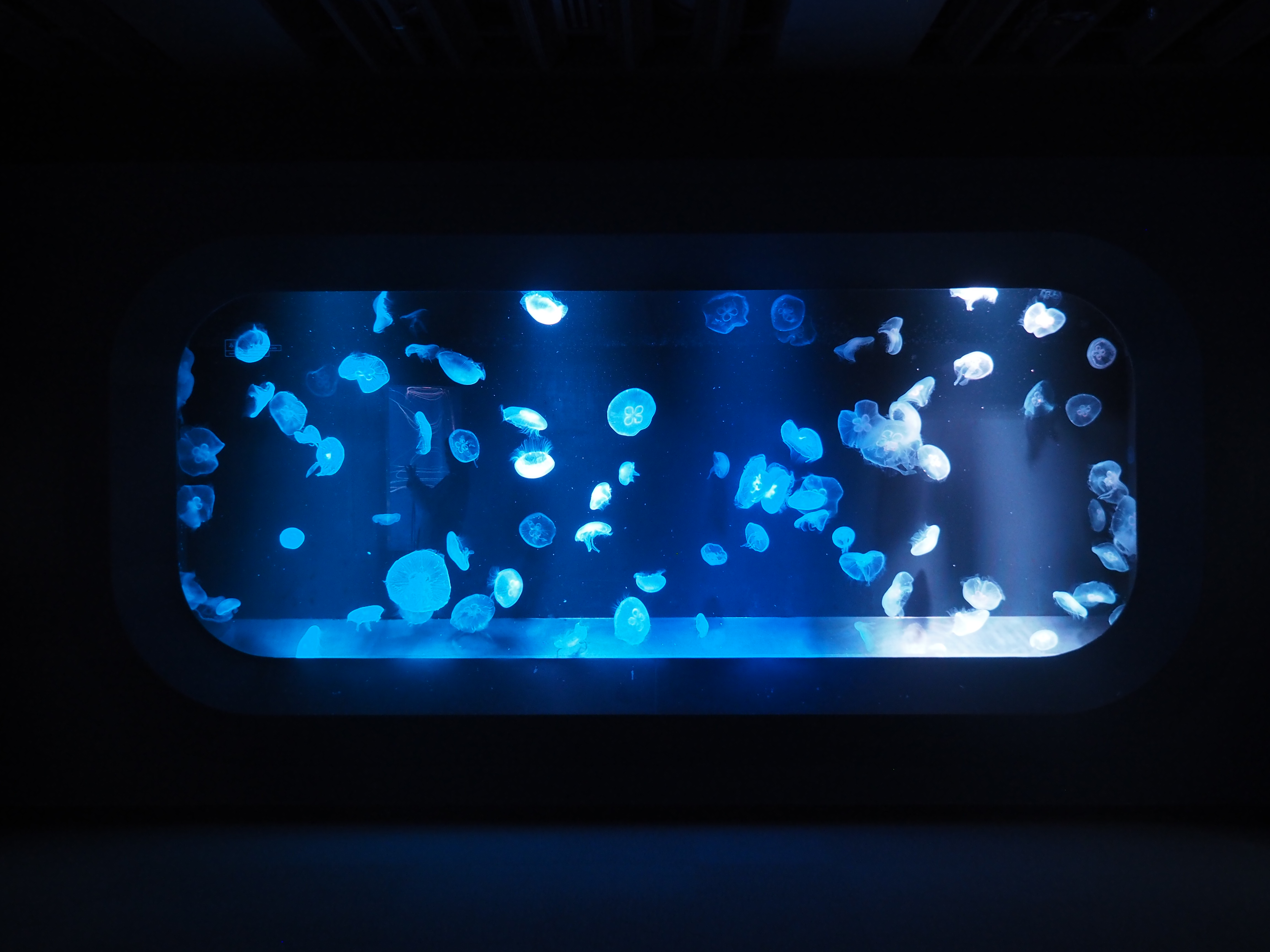

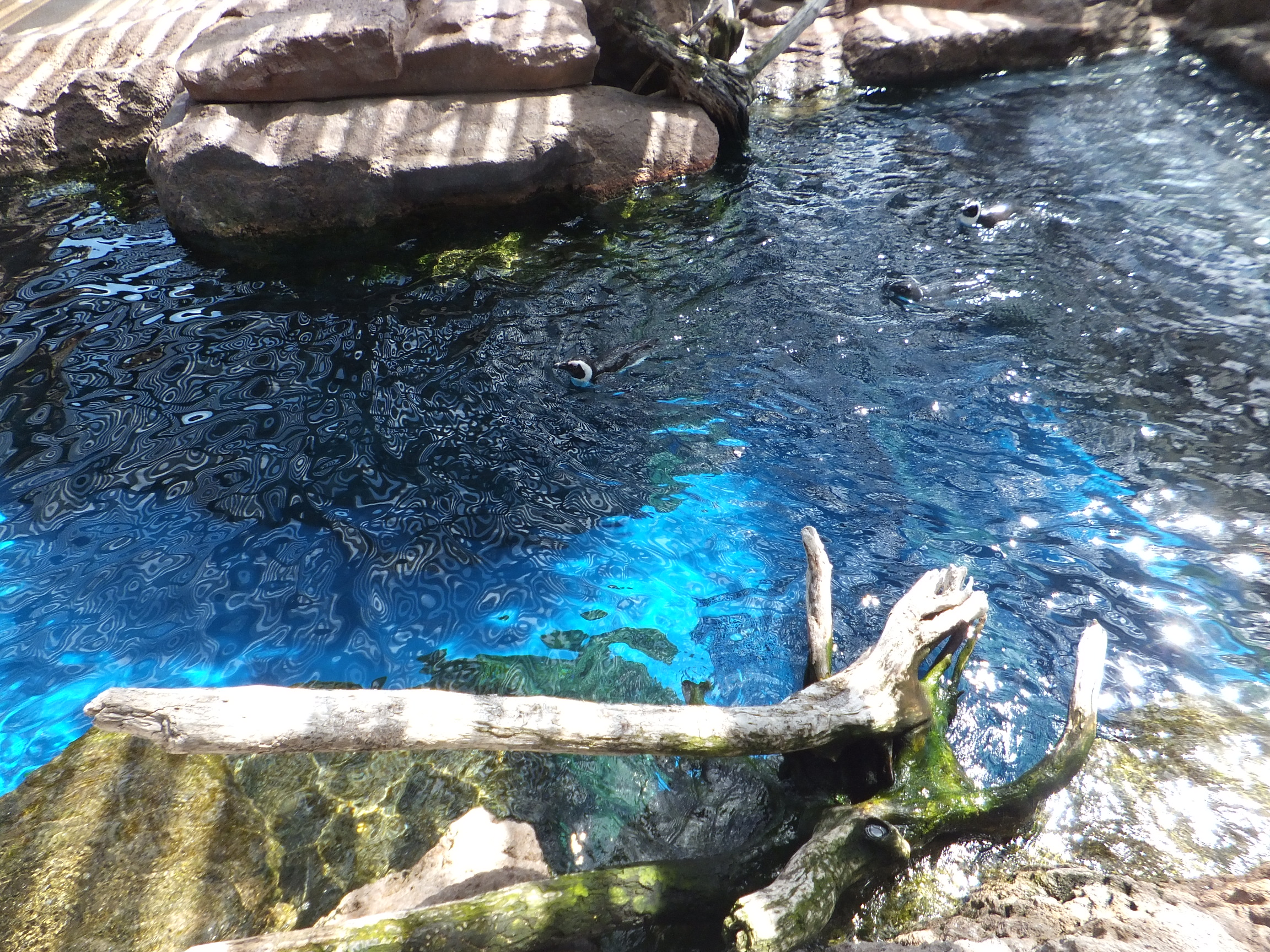

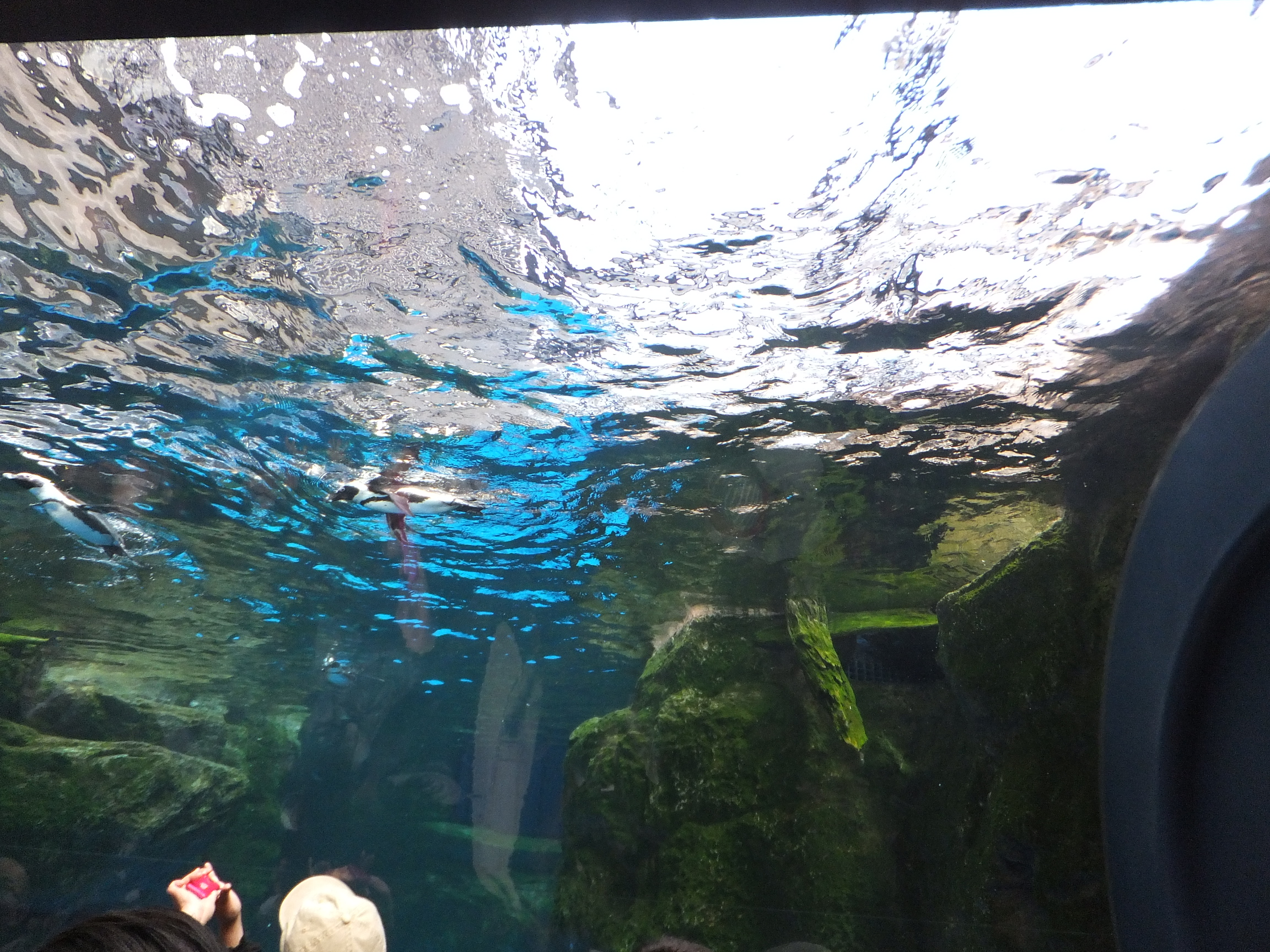

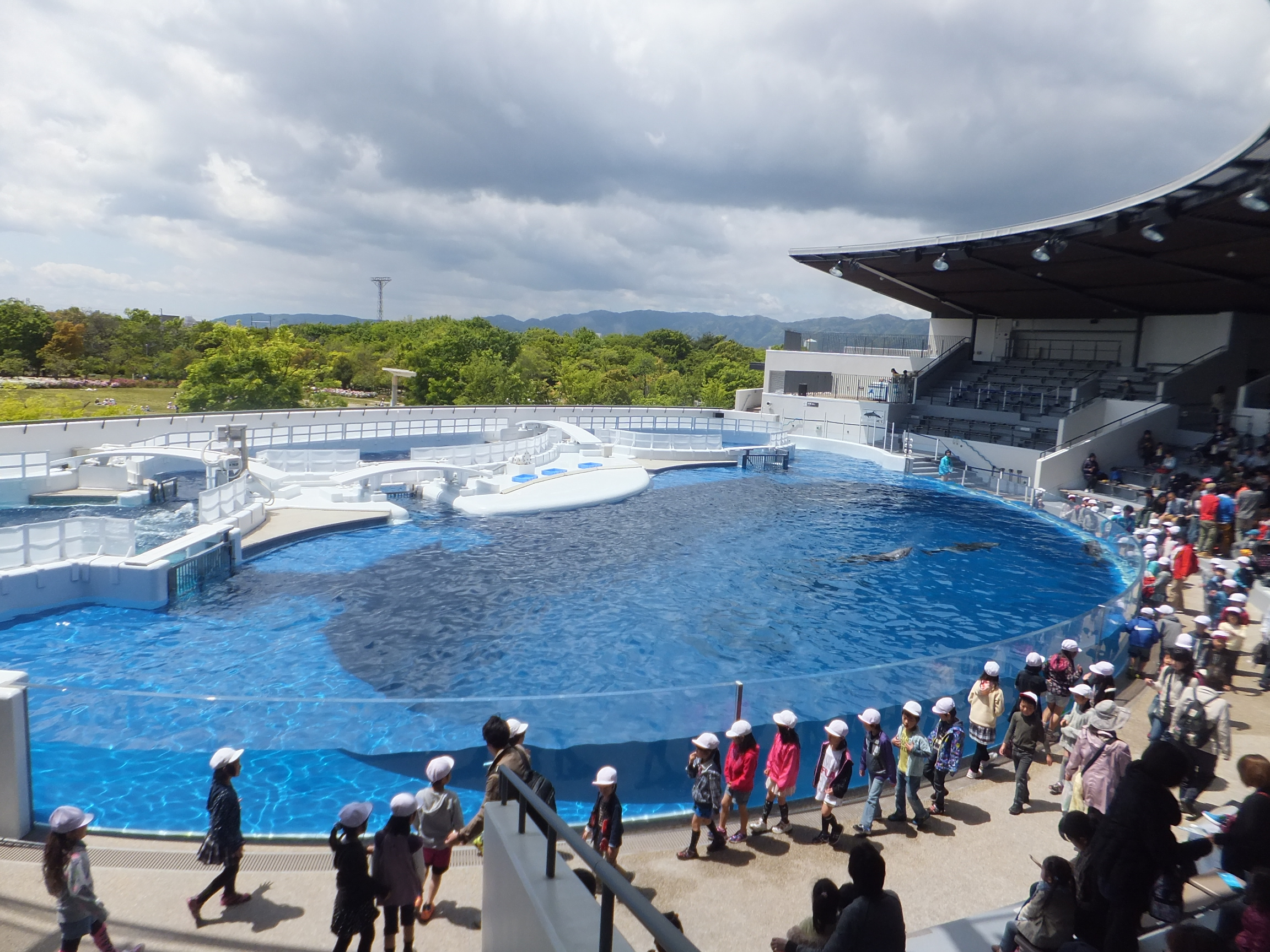

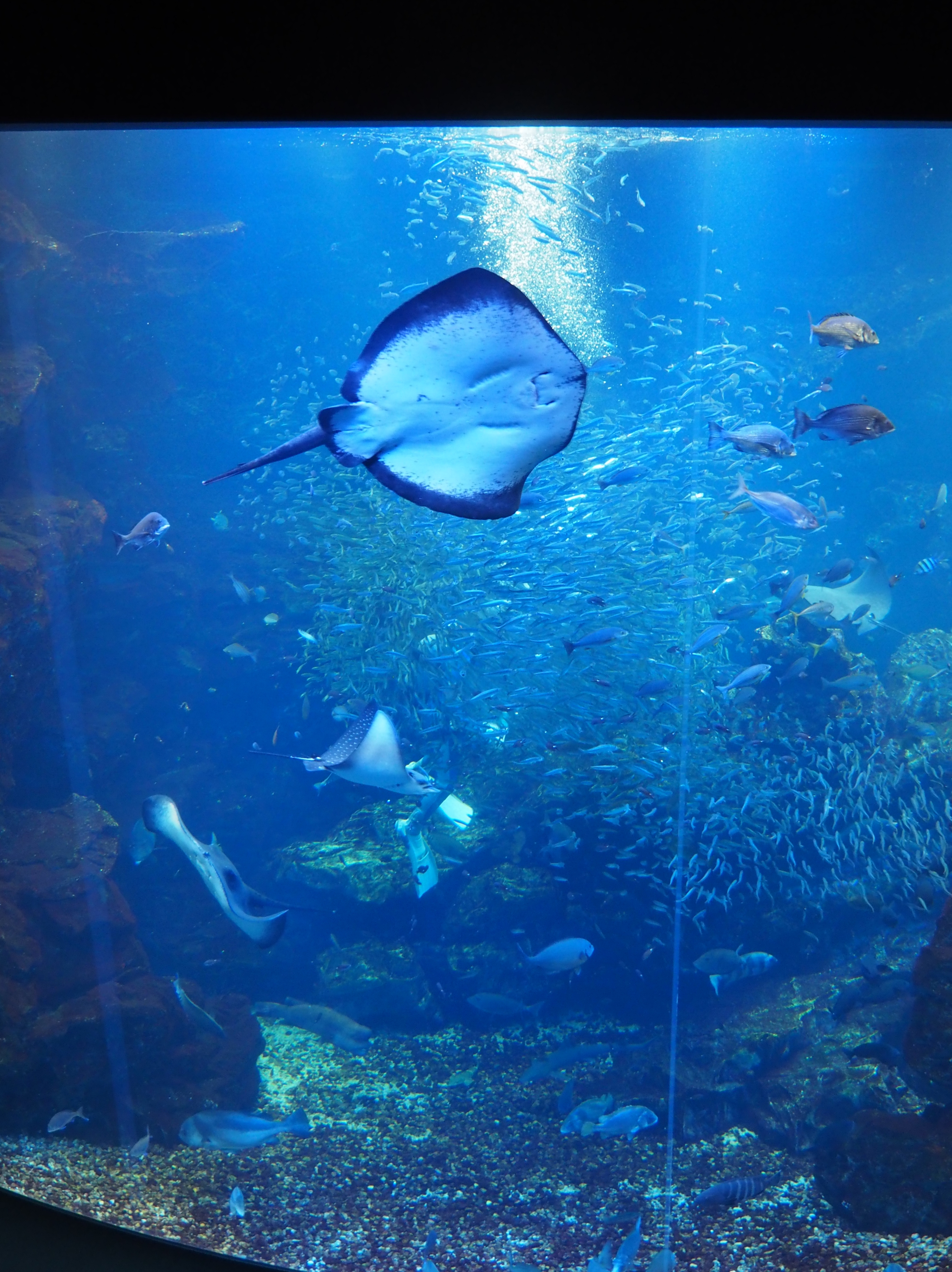

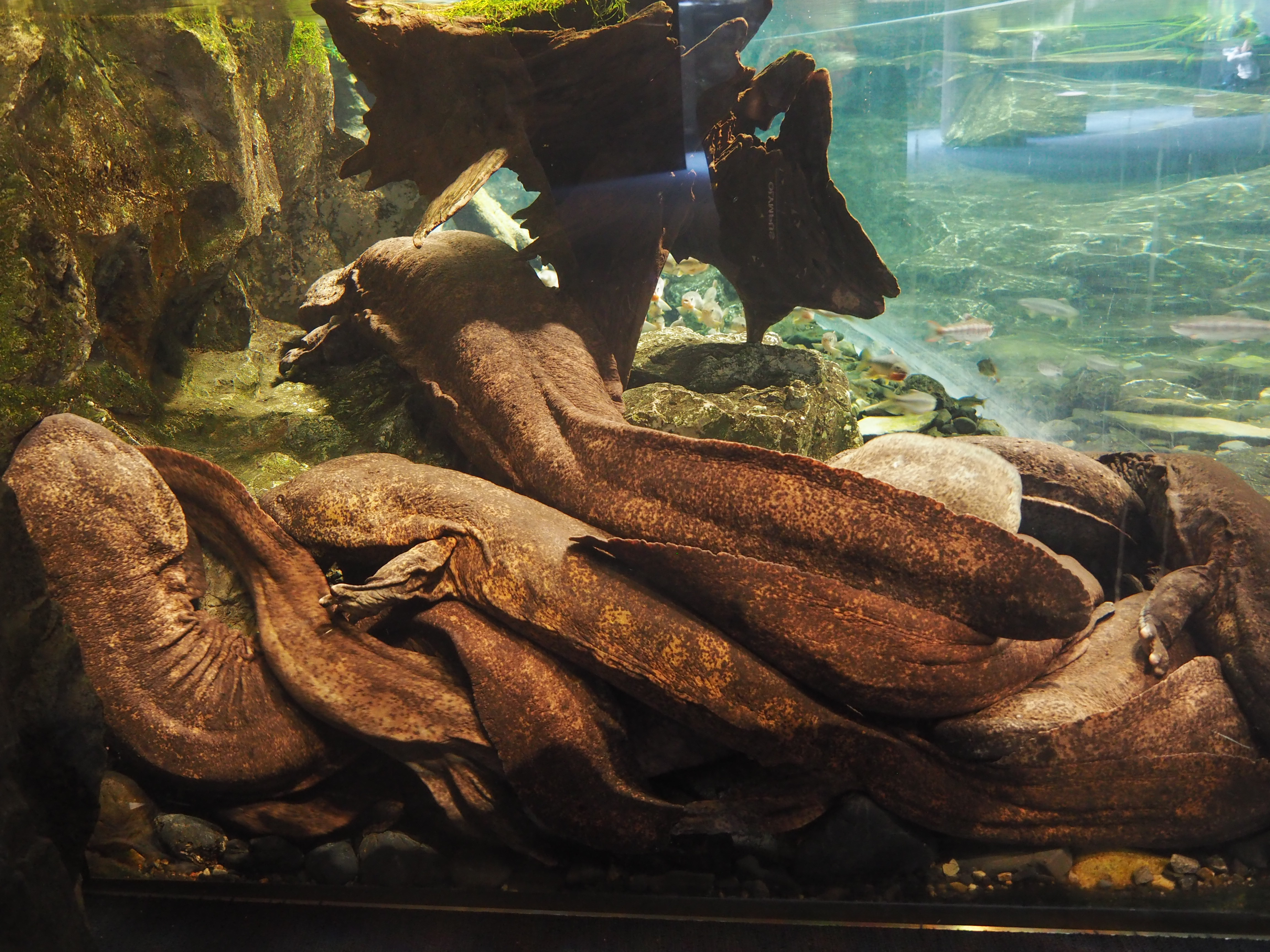

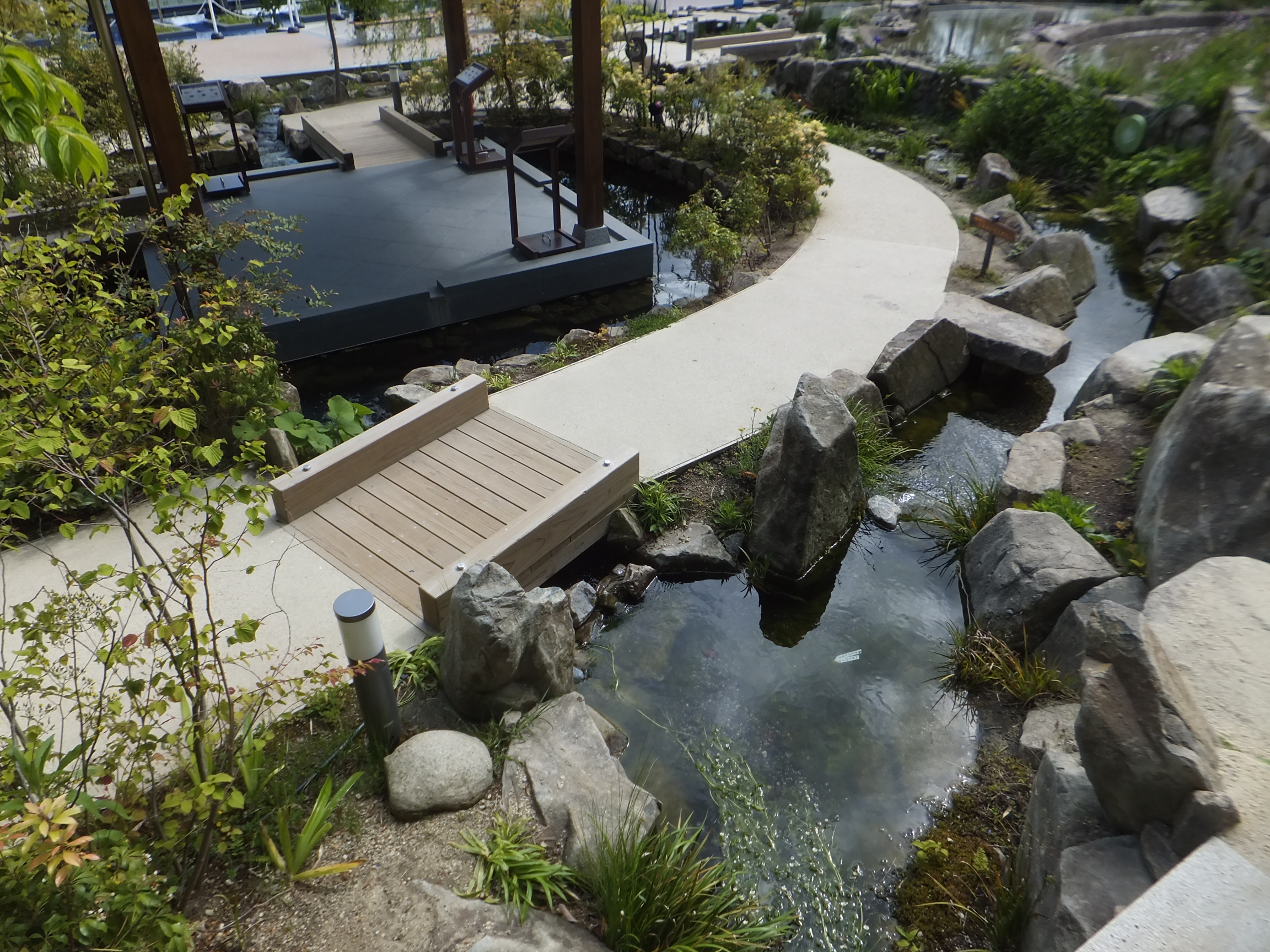

== See also ==
- Sumida Aquarium (same management)
