= List of giant squid specimens and sightings =

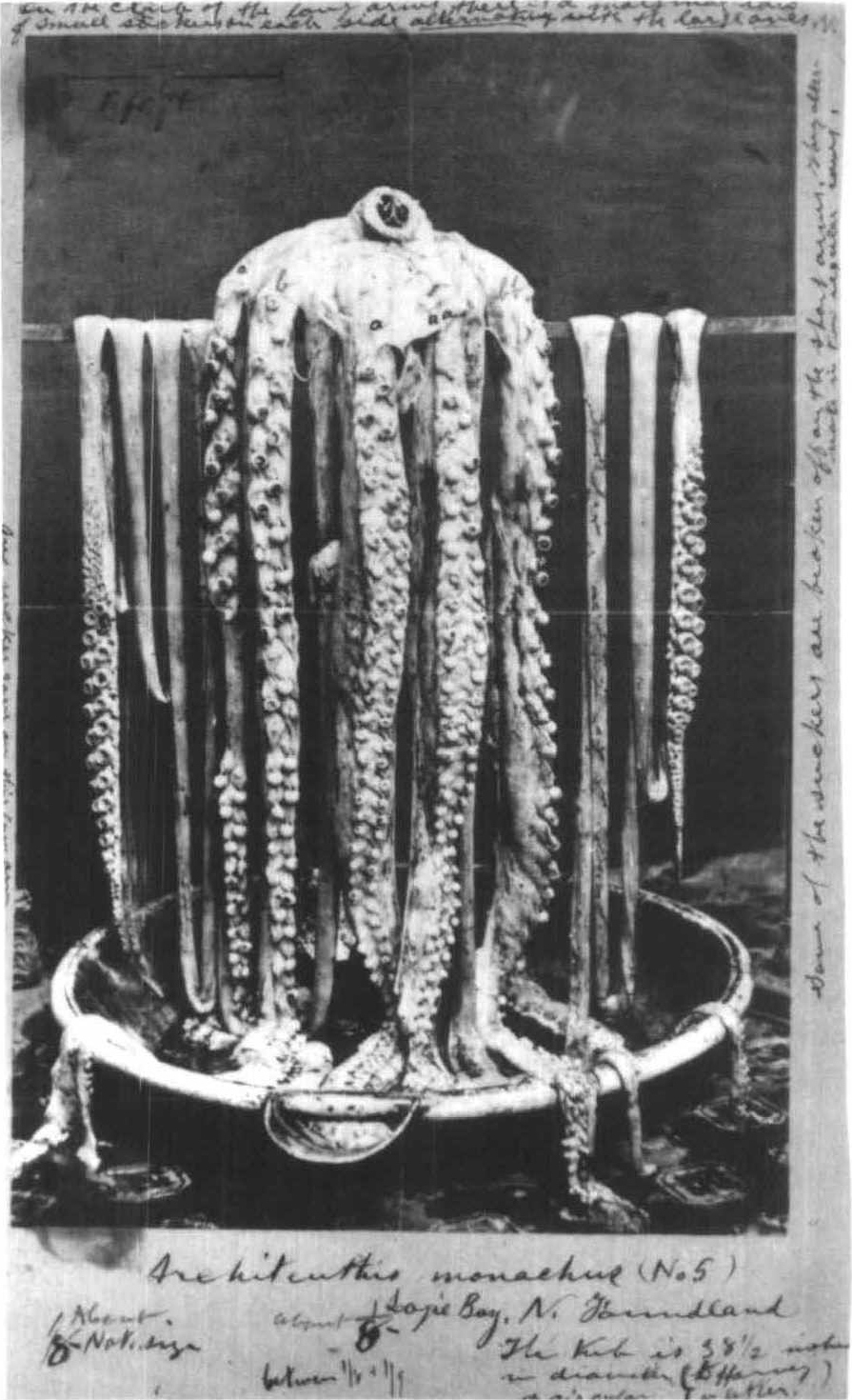
The earliest known photograph of an intact giant squid, showing the arms, tentacles and buccal region of the head (including beak) of a specimen from Logy Bay, Newfoundland (#30 on this list), draped over Reverend Moses Harvey's sponge bath, November or December 1873. Harvey wrote in his journal: "I knew that I had in my possession what all the savants in the world did not […] what the museums in the world did not contain […] A photograph could not lie and would silence the gainsayers". The photograph includes contemporaneous annotations by zoologist Addison Emery Verrill, including a 1-foot scale bar (top left) and detailed marginal notes. (Note: Verrill's marginal annotations read as follows: "Architeuthis monachus (No. 5) Logie Bay, N. Foundland about 1/8 natural size between 1/8 and 1/9. The tub is 38 1/2 inches [98 cm] in diameter and circular. Harvey (?) letter. Some of the suckers are broken off on the short arms. They alternate in two regular rows. On the club of the long arm there is a marginal row of small suckers on each side alternating with the large ones. One sucker gone on this long arm.")

This list of giant squid specimens and sightings is a comprehensive timeline of recorded human encounters with members of the genus Architeuthis, popularly known as giant squid. It includes animals that were caught by fishermen, found washed ashore, recovered (in whole or in part) from sperm whales and other predatory species, as well as those reliably sighted at sea. The list also covers specimens incorrectly assigned to the genus Architeuthis in original descriptions or later publications.

== Background ==
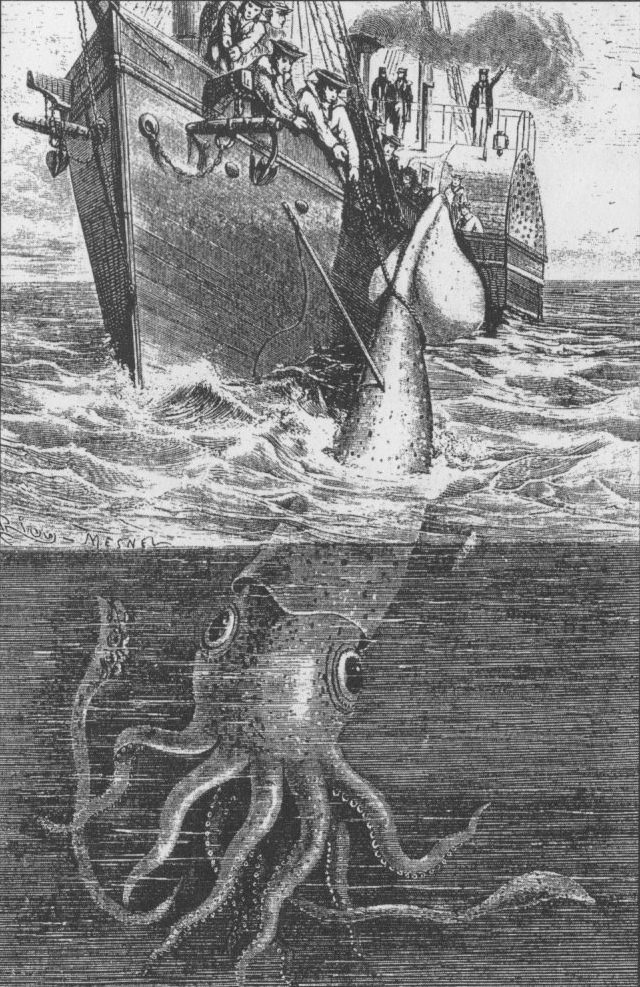
French corvette Alecton attempts to capture a giant squid in 1861 (#18). This incident almost certainly inspired the depiction of the giant squid in Jules Verne's 1870 novel Twenty Thousand Leagues Under the Seas.

=== History of discovery ===
Tales of giant squid have been common among mariners since ancient times, but the animals were long considered mythical and often associated with the kraken of Nordic legend. The giant squid did not gain widespread scientific acceptance until specimens became available to zoologists in the second half of the 19th century, beginning with the formal naming of Architeuthis dux by Japetus Steenstrup in 1857, from fragmentary Bahamian material collected two years earlier (#14 on this list). (Note: A number of naturalists had become convinced of the existence of giant cephalopods even prior to Steenstrup's writings. One example was American naturalist and physician Samuel L. Mitchill, who brought together numerous reports of such animals in letters published in his journal, The Medical Repository, in the 1810s. Another early proponent was Hamilton Smith, F.R.S., who examined a beak and other parts of an "enormous Sepia" preserved at the Museum of Haarlem (now Teylers Museum) and presented his findings to the British Association for the Advancement of Science in 1841. Prior to acquiring material evidence in the 1850s, Steenstrup himself came to accept the existence of giant ten-limbed cephalopods based solely on textual sources (see #2 and 7), writing in 1849: "Whether we could get further than to realize that it is one of the Decapod forms of the Linnean genus Sepia will depend on whether such a form will later be washed ashore" (translated from the original Danish). The existence of giant squid was also known to sperm whalers, who would occasionally witness their quarry regurgitating large fragments of these animals. Herman Melville devoted a short chapter to the giant squid in his 1851 novel Moby-Dick, several years before its formal scientific recognition by Steenstrup. Though a work of fiction, the novel has been described as including "the best description ever written of nineteenth-century Yankee whaling", with natural history accounts "as accurate as any nineteenth-century biologist's", and was partly informed by Melville's own experience on the whaling ship Acushnet. Charles Paxton has argued that the idea that naturalists prior to Steenstrup generally rejected the existence of giant cephalopods is erroneous and originates in part from Bernard Heuvelmans's "rather odd" telling of the giant squid's history in his In the Wake of the Sea-Serpents and that, on the contrary, their reality was widely accepted, at least among the British zoological community, though the danger posed to ships (as claimed by authors such as Pierre Denys de Montfort) was doubted. Joseph Banks, president of the Royal Society for more than 41 years and described by Paxton as "surely the personification of the scientific establishment in early 19th century Britain", was himself well acquainted with large squid, having eaten one (likely Taningia danae) in soup form on 3 March 1769, during James Cook's first voyage to the Pacific. In 1783, Banks presented at the Royal Society an important early paper on ambergris by the London-based German physician Franz Xavier Schwediawer, in which was recounted an observation made by fishermen some ten years earlier of a sperm whale that had in its mouth an incomplete cephalopod tentacle nearly 27 ft (8.2 m) long. To Schwediawer, this corroborated "the common saying of the fishermen, that the cuttle-fish is the largest fish of the ocean". Schwediawer's footnote would be cited "uncritically" in subsequent works, such as Thomas Beale's influential The Natural History of the Sperm Whale of 1839.) In the same work, Steenstrup also named a second species, Architeuthis monachus, based on a preserved beak, the only part saved from a carcass that washed ashore in Denmark in 1853 (#13). The giant squid came to public prominence in 1861 when the French corvette Alecton encountered a live animal (#18) at the surface while navigating near Tenerife. A report of the incident filed by the ship's captain was almost certainly seen by Jules Verne and adapted by him for the description of the monstrous squid in his 1870 novel, Twenty Thousand Leagues Under the Seas.

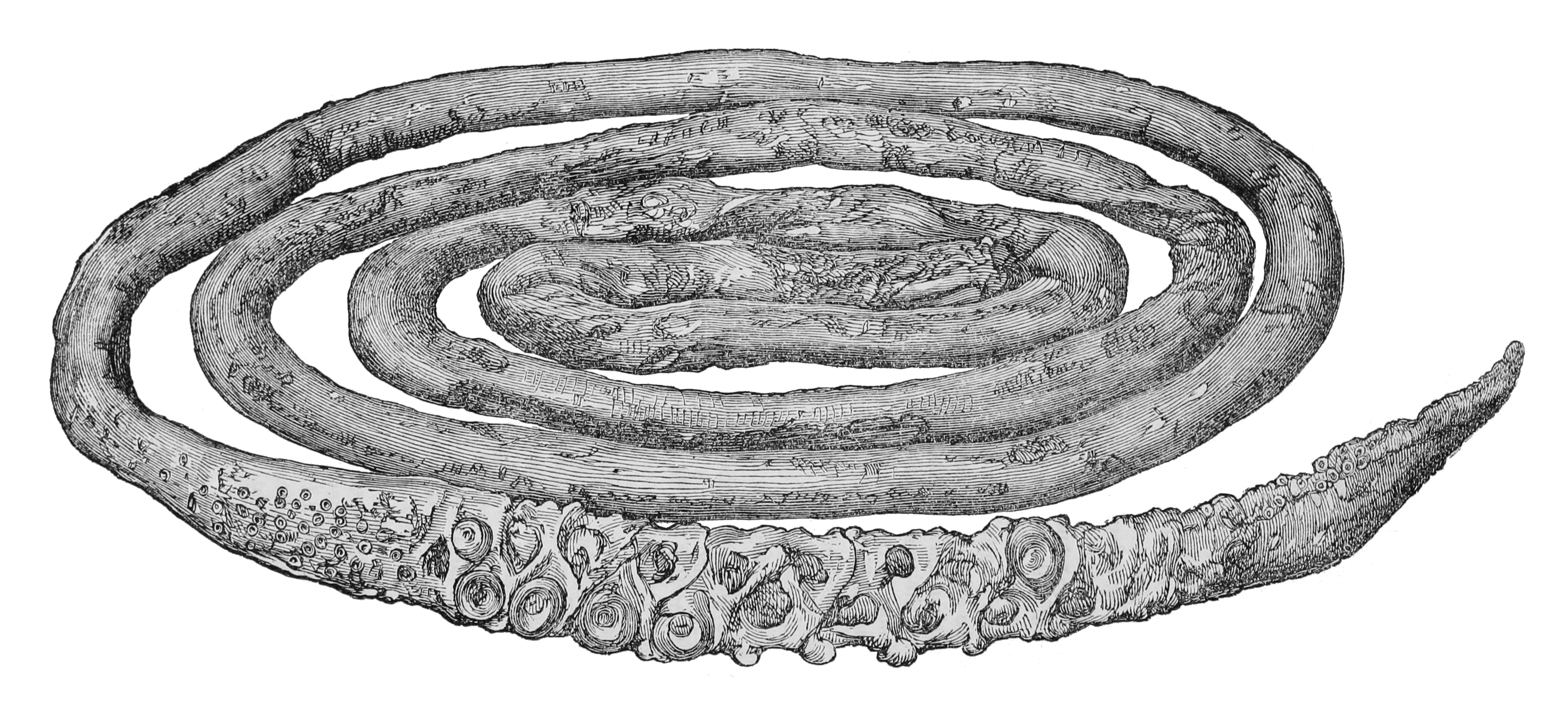
The 19-foot (5.8 m) tentacle that Newfoundland fisherman Theophilus Picot hacked off a live animal (#29) on 26 October 1873

The giant squid's existence was established beyond doubt only in the 1870s, with the appearance of an extraordinary number of complete specimens—both dead and alive—in Newfoundland waters (beginning with #21). These were meticulously documented in a series of papers by Yale zoologist Addison Emery Verrill. (Note: Ellis (1998a:86) described Verrill as someone with "an almost limitless capacity for work", who "began publishing papers on these specimens almost as fast as they came in". The full list of Verrill's publications on the Newfoundland strandings of 1870–1881 is as follows: Verrill 1874a, b, 1875a, b, c, 1876, 1877, 1878, 1880a, b, 1881a, b, 1882a, c.) Two of these Newfoundland specimens, both from 1873, were particularly significant as they were among the earliest to be photographed: first a single severed tentacle—hacked off a live animal as it "attacked" a fishing boat (#29)—and weeks later an intact animal in two parts (#30). (Note: The Logy Bay specimen of 25 ?November 1873 (#30) was the first complete giant squid to be photographed, albeit in two parts and across two frames. Although cited by Aldrich (1991:459) as "the first photographs of an architeuthid in North America", the specimen directly preceding it chronologically (by almost exactly a month; #29 from Portugal Cove) was also photographed, though here only a severed tentacle—the only part saved—was imaged. Woodcuts prepared from this latter photograph appeared in a number of periodicals of the time, including The Field and The Annals and Magazine of Natural History. The giant squid found beached on Île Saint-Paul on 2 November 1874 (#33) was another early specimen to be photographed. Perhaps the earliest of all was the beak of the October 1871 specimen (#22) from the Grand Banks of Newfoundland, whose photograph was taken some time after its discovery but already mentioned in February 1873 by Packard (1873:92).) The head and limbs of this latter specimen were famously shown draped over the sponge bath of Moses Harvey, a local clergyman, essayist, and amateur naturalist. Harvey secured and reported widely on both of these important specimens—as well as numerous others (most notably the Catalina specimen of 1877; #42)—and it was largely through his efforts that giant squid became known to North American and British zoologists. (Note: According to Harvey's entry in the Dictionary of Canadian Biography, written by giant squid expert Frederick Aldrich, "[a]t least ten per cent of his essays deal with [the giant] squid".) Recognition of Architeuthis as a real animal led to the reappraisal of earlier reports of gigantic tentacled sea creatures, with some of these subsequently being accepted as records of giant squid, the earliest stretching back to at least the 17th century.

I confess that until I saw and measured this enormous limb, I doubted the accuracy of some early observations which this specimen alone would suffice to prove worthy of confidence. The existence of gigantic cephalopods is no longer an open question. I, now, more than ever, appreciate the value of the adage: "Truth is stranger than fiction."

— Henry Lee, referring to an arm of uncertain provenance (#27) at the British Museum (Natural History) that was examined by him in May 1873, from the concluding lines of his 1875 book The Octopus; or, the "devil-fish" of fiction and of fact.

For a time in the late 19th century, almost every major specimen of which material was saved was described as a new species. In all, some twenty species names were coined. However, there is no widely agreed basis for distinguishing between the named species, and both morphological and genetic data point to the existence of a single, globally distributed species, which according to the principle of priority must be known by the earliest available name: Architeuthis dux.

It is not known why giant squid become stranded on shore, but it may be because the distribution of deep, cold water where they live is temporarily altered. Marine biologist and Architeuthis specialist Frederick Aldrich proposed that there may be a periodicity to the strandings around Newfoundland, and based on historical data suggested an average interval between mass strandings of some 30 years. Aldrich used this value to correctly predict a relatively small stranding event between 1964 and 1966 (beginning with #169). The appearance of specimens around New Zealand has been linked to the El Niño–Southern Oscillation, with multiple strandings in the Cook Strait in 1879–1880 (beginning with #47) and 1982–1984 coinciding with or immediately following extreme negative peaks of the Southern Oscillation Index. Although strandings continue to occur sporadically throughout the world, few have been as frequent as those in Newfoundland in the late 19th century. (Note: Unconfirmed mass appearances of giant squid include the claim by Frederick Aldrich that a "school of 60 has been sighted off the coast of Newfoundland" (cf. #38). Richard Ellis noted that Aldrich never repeated this claim in print, "so it is likely that he learned it was not accurately reported". However, Aldrich had earlier given more details in an interview with The Muse, where he stated that in autumn 1964 a Japanese trawler operating around 100 miles (160 km) off St. John's "went through a school of sixty or seventy of these animals frolicking on the surface of the water". Aldrich also told Clyde Roper that "Grand Banks fishermen have reported seeing hundreds of giant squid bodies floating on the surface".) A notable exception was a 15-month period between 2014 and 2015, during which an unprecedented 57 specimens were recorded from Japanese coastal waters of the Sea of Japan (beginning with #563).

Though the total number of recorded giant squid specimens now runs into the hundreds, the species remains notoriously elusive and little known. Attempts to capture a glimpse of a live giant squid—described as "the most elusive image in natural history"—were mooted since at least the 1960s. Efforts intensified significantly towards the end of the century, with the launch of several multi-million-dollar expeditions in the late 1990s, though these were all unsuccessful. The first years of the 21st century saw a number of breakthroughs in live giant squid imaging that ultimately culminated in the first recordings of live animals (#548 and 549) in their natural deep-water habitat—from both a remote camera system and a crewed submersible—in July 2012. Despite these recent advances and the growing number of both specimens and recordings of live animals, the species continues to occupy a unique place in the public imagination. As Roper et al. (2015:83) wrote: "Few events in the natural world stimulate more excitement and curiosity among scientists and laymen alike than the discovery of a specimen of Architeuthis."

=== Distribution patterns ===
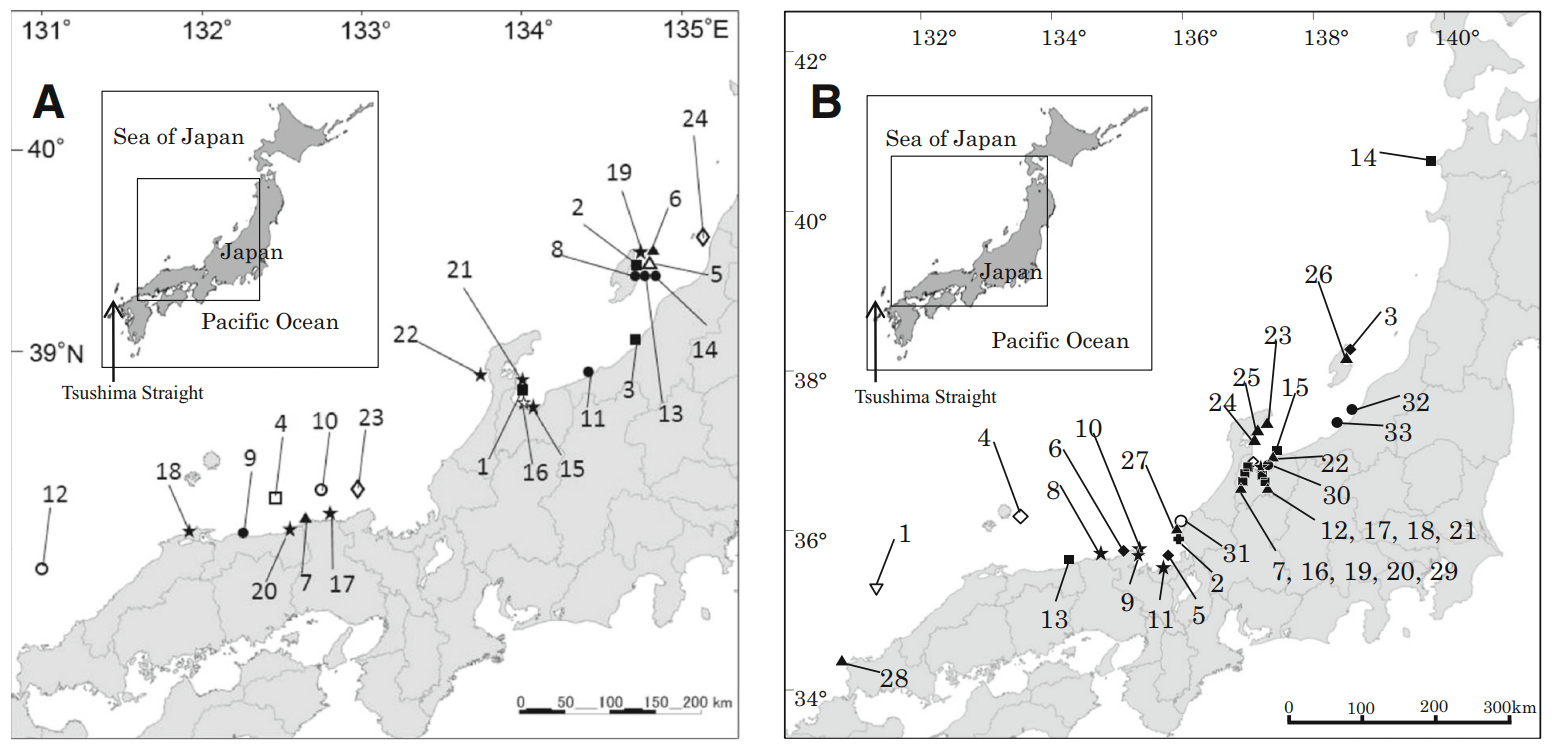
Locations of the 57 giant squid specimens encountered in the Sea of Japan between January 2014 and March 2015, in what remains the largest mass appearance of this species ever recorded, from Kubodera et al. (2016). The two maps show specimens (numbered chronologically) from the two main stranding events in January–May 2014 (A; spanning #563 to 589) and September 2014–March 2015 (B; spanning #590 to 631).

The genus Architeuthis has a cosmopolitan or bi-subtropical distribution, and carcasses are known to wash ashore on every continent except Antarctica. The greatest numbers of specimens have been recorded in: the North Atlantic around Newfoundland (historically), northern Spain (more recently), Norway, the northern British Isles, and the archipelagos of the Azores and Madeira; the South Atlantic off South Africa and Namibia; the northwestern Pacific off Japan (especially more recently); and the southwestern Pacific around New Zealand and Australia.

The vast majority of specimens are of oceanic origin, including marginal seas broadly open to adjacent ocean, especially the Tasman Sea and Sea of Japan, but also the Gulf of Mexico and Caribbean Sea, among others. A handful are known from the far western Mediterranean Sea (#383, 447, 498, and 550), but these records do not necessarily indicate that the Mediterranean falls within the natural range of the giant squid, as the specimens may have been transported there by inflowing Atlantic water. Similarly, giant squid are unlikely to naturally occur in the North Sea owing to its shallow depth (but see #107 and 113, the only known English strandings). They are generally absent from equatorial and high polar latitudes (but see #215 and 249 from equatorial Atlantic waters, and specimens from northern Norway or #102 from the edge of the Arctic Circle off western Greenland).

=== Total number of specimens ===
According to Guerra et al. (2006), 592 confirmed giant squid specimens were known as of the end of 2004. Of these, 306 came from the Atlantic Ocean, 264 from the Pacific Ocean, 20 from the Indian Ocean, and 2 from the Mediterranean Sea. The figures for specimens collected in the Atlantic and Pacific Oceans further broke down as follows: 148 in the northeastern Atlantic, 126 in the northwestern Atlantic, 26 in the southeastern Atlantic, 6 in the southwestern Atlantic, 43 in the northeastern Pacific, 28 in the northwestern Pacific, 10 in the southeastern Pacific, and 183 in the southwestern Pacific.

Guerra & González (2009) reported that the total number of recorded giant squid specimens stood at 624. Guerra et al. (2011) gave an updated figure of 677 specimens (see table below). Paxton (2016a) put the total at around 700 as of 2015, of which c. 460 had been measured in some way. This number has increased substantially in recent years, with 57 specimens recorded from the Sea of Japan over an extraordinary 15-month period in 2014–2015 (beginning with #563). The giant squid nevertheless remains a rarely encountered animal, especially considering its wide distribution and large size, with Richard Ellis writing that "each giant squid that washes up or is taken from the stomach of a sperm whale is still an occasion for a teuthological celebration".

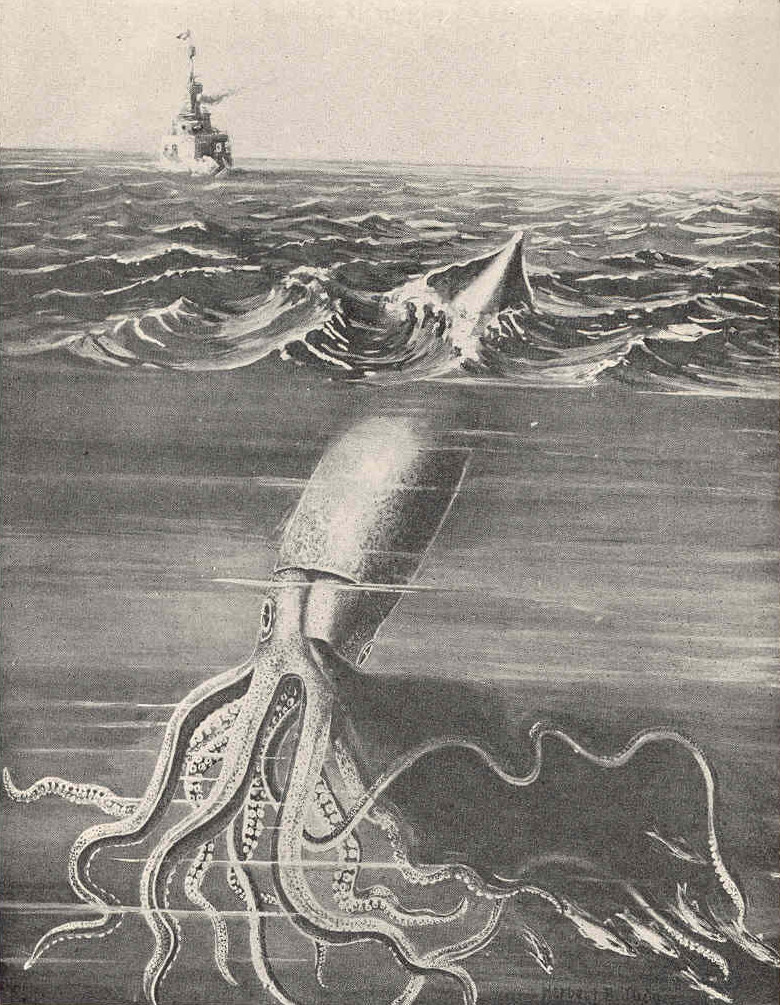
Giant squid at the surface with an approaching ship in the background, from a painting by Herbert B. Judy, 1905. Specimens found stranded or floating at the surface constitute almost 50% of all records from the Atlantic Ocean (see table).

Records of giant squid specimens sorted by region and method of capture (from Guerra et al., 2011)
Region	Number of specimens	% of total	Found stranded or floating (%)	From fishing (%)	From predators (%)	Method of capture unknown (%)
NE Atlantic	152	22.5	49	31	15	5
NW Atlantic	148	21.9	61	30	1	8
SE Atlantic	60*	8.9	10	60	17	13
SW Atlantic	6	0.9	50	16	1	33
NE Pacific	43	6.4	7	56	30	7
NW Pacific	30*	4.4	30	35	30	5
SE Pacific	10	1.5	90	10	0	0
SW Pacific	183	27.0	12	41	42	5
Indian Ocean	33**	4.8	6	94	0	0
W Mediterranean	3	0.4	100	0	0	0
Equatorial/tropical	9	1.3	11	44	45	0
All regions	677	100.0				

* Underestimates according to Guerra et al. (2011)
** Includes records from Durban, South Africa

"Wanted" poster issued by Frederick Aldrich on 24 August 1988. The flailing giant squid is from an illustration by Canadian wildlife artist Glen Loates, known for his naturalistic depictions of "Architeuthis in action", which were based on collaborations with Aldrich and which Richard Ellis described as "certainly the most accurate and exciting depictions of the monster ever drawn".

=== Procurement, preservation, and display ===
Preserved giant squid specimens are much sought after for both study and display. In the mid-1960s, marine biologist and giant squid expert Frederick Aldrich of the Memorial University of Newfoundland organised a "squid squad" with the intent of securing specimens for study. In the 1980s, Aldrich resorted to distributing eye-catching "Wanted" posters offering rewards for "finding and holding" specimens stranded on the Newfoundland coast, "the value being dependent on their condition". Aldrich (1991:459) wrote that "[s]uch efforts were not futile, for in the intervening years I have secured either the specimens or information on 15 animals", though according to Hoff (2003:85) the rewards went unclaimed. Largely through Aldrich's efforts, the Marine Sciences Research Laboratory at Logy Bay, Newfoundland, assembled a substantial early collection of giant squid; as of 1971, it held 8 specimens, with the remains of 3 displayed together in a tank by the main entrance.

Guerra et al. (2011:1990) estimated that around 30 giant squid were exhibited at museums and aquaria worldwide, while Guerra & Segonzac (2014:118–119) provided an updated list of 35 (21 in national museums and 14 in private institutions; see table below). The purpose-built Museo del Calamar Gigante in Luarca, Spain, had by far the largest collection on public display (4 females and 1 male), but many of the museum's 14 or so total specimens were destroyed during a storm on 2 February 2014. At least 13 specimens were exhibited in Japan as of February 2017, of which 10 had been acquired since 2013.

A number of fragmentary giant squid remains were displayed as part of "In Search of Giant Squid", a Smithsonian travelling exhibition curated by Clyde Roper that visited a dozen US museums and other educational institutions between September 2004 and August 2009. The exhibition opened its national tour at Yale University's Peabody Museum of Natural History, which has maintained a strong association with the giant squid from the time of the Newfoundland strandings in the 1870s. Preparations for the Peabody exhibition, overseen by site curator Eric Lazo-Wasem, uncovered giant squid material in the museum's collections that was not previously known to be extant, including original specimens from Addison Emery Verrill's time.

Architeuthis is an elusive creature. Its occasional appearance on various beaches around the world has provided hardly more than a glimpse of its majestic and intimidating appearance, and hauling it out of the water in a trawl does it no justice either. Papier-mâché or fiberglass models have given us a sense of its size and shape, but they have not captured its mystery and vitality. The spirit of Architeuthis may well be uncapturable; at least no museum has even come close to this fabulous creature—the only living animal for which the term sea monster is truly applicable.

— Richard Ellis, from the closing remarks of his 1997 article "The models of Architeuthis"

In the late 19th century, the giant squid's popular appeal and desirability to museums—but scarcity of preserved specimens—spawned a long tradition of "life-sized" models that continues to the present day. Verrill's description of the famous Catalina specimen of 1877 (#42), which he personally examined in New York City the same year, served as the basis for the earliest models. (Note: These three-dimensional models were preceded by a full-scale painted wooden cutout, with arms 35 ft (11 m) long, that was prepared by Francis Trevelyan Buckland in the 1870s for his Museum of Economic Fish Culture in South Kensington, London. Its appearance was based on official papers and photographs Buckland received through the Colonial Office in December 1873 relating to both the first Portugal Cove specimen (#29) and the Logy Bay specimen (#30). Buckland's cutout has been described as the "first attempt to show the public what a giant squid really looked like".) The second Portugal Cove specimen, from 1881 (#60), was probably also used as a reference, as it was seen by Verrill shortly before he began modelling. Following Verrill's design, his draughtsman James Henry Emerton built the very first giant squid model for the Peabody Museum of Natural History in 1883. A second, near-identical model was soon delivered to the Museum of Comparative Zoology at Harvard University, and a third was made for the International Fisheries Exhibition, held in London in 1883. The Verrill and Emerton models were followed by six similar examples, again based on the Catalina specimen, produced by Ward's Natural Science Establishment of Rochester, New York, of which two were sold internationally: to London's Natural History Museum and the Oceanographic Museum of Monaco. The original Peabody Museum model was discarded around 1964 and replaced two years later by one based on both the Logy Bay specimen of 1873 (#30) and on several Newfoundland specimens from the 1960s, particularly the one found off Conche in October 1964 (#169).

Real giant squid specimens have traditionally been preserved in either solutions of alcohols (particularly ethanol and isopropyl alcohol) or in formalin. More recently, concerns about the fire and health risks posed by these substances (Note: See giant squid specimen #661, whose tank leaked around 1 tonne of formalin in February 2022, resulting in the month-long closure of the Ibaraki Nature Museum near Tokyo, Japan.) have led to alternative preservative fluids being explored, such as propylene glycol (#254), glycerol (#495), and the hydrofluoroether Novec 7100. Additionally, methods such as plastination have made it possible to display authentic giant squid specimens in a dry state. A giant squid was first plastinated in 2000 and this specimen, nicknamed "Wheke" (#429), has been on display at the Muséum national d'histoire naturelle in Paris since 2008; two further specimens were plastinated in 2004, as were various parts of a 2015 specimen from Japan (#609). Several other individuals have been prepared for display by more conventional drying methods, such as hard curing (e.g. #598, 603, and 617), though this necessarily results in greatly shrunken specimens. At least one giant squid has been entirely embedded in acrylic, a process that rendered its flesh translucent (#632). Beginning in 2005, a specimen nicknamed "Cal" (#495) was uniquely displayed at Melbourne Aquarium encased in a 3.5-tonne block of ice (reportedly the largest man-made ice block in the world); it was turned into a conventional wet specimen several years later. Additionally, a number of other specimens have been temporarily placed on public display in a frozen or chilled state (e.g. #564, 585, 592, 603, 662, 669, 675, 677, 679, and 680).

Partial list of giant squid specimens on public display as of 2014 (from Guerra & Segonzac, 2014:118–119)
Institution	Location	Country	Type	Specimen(s)
American Museum of Natural History	New York City, New York	United States	national museum	1 female (#385)
Auckland University of Technology	Auckland, North Island	New Zealand	private	1 female (200 kg)
Aula del Mar Málaga / Museo Alborania	Málaga, Andalusia	Spain	private	1 female (#383)
Centro de Gestión del Medio Marino del Estrecho (Regional Government of Andalusia)	Algeciras, Andalusia	Spain	private	1 female (90 kg)
Deep Sea World	North Queensferry, Scotland	United Kingdom	private	1 female
Florida Museum of Natural History	Gainesville, Florida	United States	national museum	1 female (#542)
Georgia Aquarium	Atlanta, Georgia	United States	private	1 female (#240)
Iziko South African Museum	Cape Town, Western Cape	South Africa	national museum	1 female (1.8 m ML)
Kaikoura Marine Centre and Aquarium	Kaikōura, South Island	New Zealand	private	1 female (#551)
Kelly Tarlton's Sea Life Aquarium	Auckland, North Island	New Zealand	private	1 female
Melbourne Museum	Melbourne, Victoria	Australia	national museum	1 female (12 m TL; 170 kg)
Mote Aquarium	Sarasota, Florida	United States	private	1 female (#407)
Museo de Historia Natural (Sociedade Galega de Historia Natural)	Ferrol, Galicia	Spain	national museum	1 female (90 kg)
Museo del Calamar Gigante	Luarca, Asturias	Spain	national museum	4 females; 1 male
Museo Nacional de Ciencias Naturales	Madrid, Community of Madrid	Spain	national museum	1 female (#447)
Muséum national d'histoire naturelle	Paris, Île-de-France	France	national museum	1 female (#429)
Museum of New Zealand Te Papa Tongarewa	Wellington, North Island	New Zealand	national museum	1 female
Museu Oceanográfico do Portinho da Arrábida	Setúbal, Lisboa Region	Portugal	national museum	1 male (mature; 2 m TL; 60 kg)
National Institute of Water and Atmospheric Research	Auckland, North Island	New Zealand	private	1 female
National Marine Aquarium	Plymouth, England	United Kingdom	private	1 female (#463)
National Museum of Natural History	Washington, D.C.	United States	national museum	1 female (13 m TL); 1 male (6 m TL)
National Museum of Nature and Science	Taito City, Tokyo	Japan	national museum	1 female (#379)
National Museum of Scotland	Edinburgh, Scotland	United Kingdom	national museum	1 female
Natural History Museum	London, England	United Kingdom	national museum	1 female (#487)
Naturalis Biodiversity Center	Leiden, South Holland	Netherlands	private	1 male (#260)
Okinawa Churaumi Aquarium	Motobu, Okinawa Prefecture	Japan	private	1 female (#349)
Queensland Museum	Brisbane, Queensland	Australia	private	1 female (#495)
Tasmanian Museum and Art Gallery	Hobart, Tasmania	Australia	national museum	2 females (#466 and 514)
The Rooms (ex Memorial University of Newfoundland)	St. John's, Newfoundland and Labrador	Canada	private	1 female (#254)

=== Reported sizes ===
Giant squid found at Ranheim in Trondheimsfjord, Norway, on 2 October 1954 (#136), being examined by Professors Erling Sivertsen and Svein Haftorn. This specimen measured 9.24 m in total length and had a mantle length of 1.79 m.

Giant squid size—long a subject of both popular debate and academic inquiry—has often been misreported and exaggerated. Reports of specimens reaching or even exceeding 18 m (59 ft) in total length are widespread, (Note: Dery (2013) wrote that "virtually every general-interest article dutifully repeats the magic number of 60 feet [18.3 m]". This figure matches that estimated for the total length of the Portugal Cove specimen of 1873 (#29) and is close to that given for the total length of the Architeuthis longimanus holotype, which describer Thomas William Kirk variously cited as 55 ft 2 in (16.81 m) or 57 ft (17.4 m) and which the fisherman who found the specimen gave as 62 ft (18.9 m).) but no animals approaching this size have been scientifically documented in recent times, despite the hundreds of specimens available for study. The 55 ft (16.76 m) "Thimble Tickle specimen" (#45) reported by Verrill (1880a:191) is often cited as the largest giant squid ever recorded, (Note: Other specimens claimed at various times to be the largest giant squid on record include #47, 121, 371, 480, 491, and 647 (see also #29, 42, 46, 62, 104, 114, 137, 151, 171, 209, 342, and 524).) and the 55 ft 2 in (16.81 m) (or 57 ft [17.37 m]) specimen described by Kirk (1888) as Architeuthis longimanus (#62)—a strangely proportioned animal that has been much commented on—is sometimes cited as the longest. It is now thought likely that such lengths were achieved by great lengthening of the two long feeding tentacles, analogous to stretching elastic bands, or resulted from inadequate measurement methods such as pacing.

Based on a 40-year data set of more than 50 giant squid (Architeuthis dux) specimens, Roper & Shea (2013:114) suggest an average total length (TL) at maturity of 11 m (36 ft) and a "rarely encountered maximum length" of 14–15 m (46–49 ft). Of the nearly 100 specimens examined by Clyde Roper, the largest was "46 feet (14 m) long". O'Shea & Bolstad (2008) give a maximum total length of 13 m (43 ft) for females based on the examination of more than 130 specimens, measured post mortem and relaxed, as well as beaks recovered from sperm whales (which do not exceed the size of those found in the largest complete specimens). Steve O'Shea estimated the maximum total length for males at 10 m (33 ft). Yukhov (2014:242) gives a maximum total length of 11.8 m (39 ft) for the species, based on records from the southern hemisphere; Remeslo (2011) gives 13.1 m (43 ft). McClain et al. (2015) regard a 12-metre (39 ft) specimen from Asturias, Spain (#480), as the "longest scientifically verified" and "largest recorded and well-preserved specimen in the contemporary, peer-reviewed literature". Charles G. M. Paxton performed a statistical analysis using literature records of giant squid specimens and concluded that "squid with a conservative TL of 20 m [66 ft] would seem likely based on current data", but the study has been heavily criticised by experts in the field.

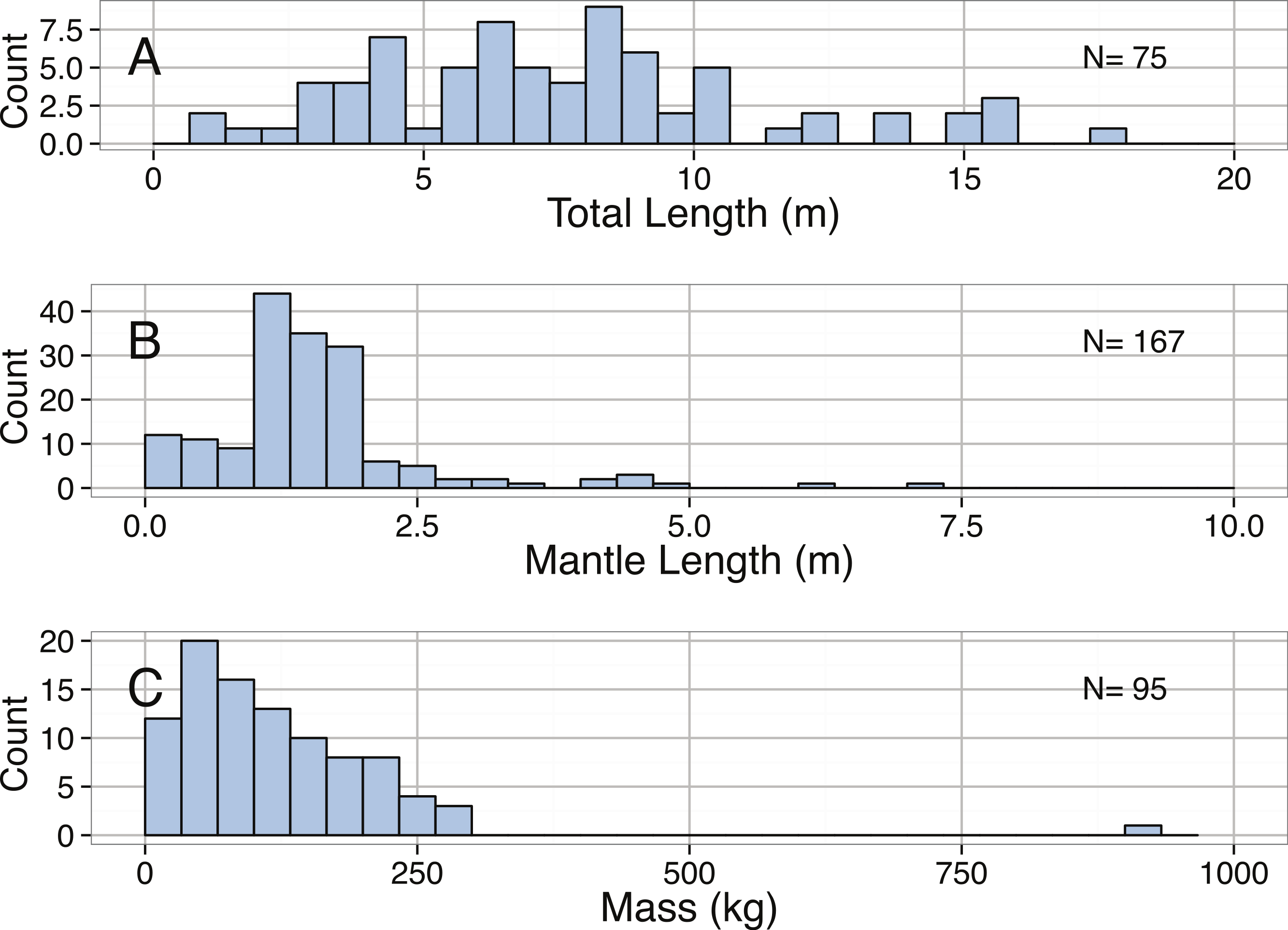
Frequency distribution of total length, mantle length, and mass in Architeuthis dux, from McClain et al. (2015) (see also linear regressions). The 2,000 lb (910 kg) extreme outlier (#22) is from an estimate mentioned in Verrill (1880a:181) and is unlikely to be accurate; the next most massive individual in the data set was only 700 lb (320 kg) and 95% of specimens were below 250 kg (550 lb). Similarly, 95% of individuals had recorded mantle lengths below 3.26 m (10.7 ft) and total lengths below 15.26 m (50.1 ft).

O'Shea & Bolstad (2008) give a maximum mantle length (ML) of 225 cm (7.38 ft) based on the examination of more than 130 specimens, as well as beaks recovered from sperm whales (which do not exceed the size of those found in the largest complete specimens), though there are recent scientific records of specimens that slightly exceed this size (such as #371, a 240 cm (7.9 ft) ML female captured off Tasmania, Australia; see also #647, with an estimated 2.15–3.06 m ML). Remeslo (2011) and Yukhov (2014:248) give a maximum mantle length of 260 cm (8.5 ft) for females from southern waters. Questionable records of up to 500 cm (16 ft) ML can be found in older literature. Paxton (2016a) accepts a maximum recorded ML of 279 cm (9.15 ft), based on the Lyall Bay specimen (#47) reported by Kirk (1880:312), but this record has been called into question as the gladius of this specimen (which should approximate the mantle length) was said to be only 190 cm (6.2 ft) long.

Including the head and arms but excluding the tentacles (standard length), the species very rarely exceeds 5 m (16 ft) according to O'Shea & Bolstad (2008). Paxton (2016a) considers 9.45 m (31.0 ft) to be the greatest reliably measured SL, based on a specimen (#46) reported by Verrill (1880a:192), and considers specimens of 10 m (33 ft) SL or more to be "very probable", but these conclusions have been criticised by giant squid experts.

O'Shea (2003b) put the maximum weight of female giant squid at 275 kg (606 lb), based on the examination of some 105 specimens as well as beaks recovered from sperm whales (which do not exceed the size of those found in the largest complete specimens; some of the heaviest recent specimens include #491 and 524). Giant squid are sexually size dimorphic, with the maximum weight for males estimated at 150 kg (330 lb), though heavier specimens have occasionally been reported (see #412 for a 190 kg (420 lb) specimen). Similarly, Remeslo (2011) and Yukhov (2014:248) give maximum masses of 250–260 kg (550–570 lb) and 150 kg (330 lb) for females and males, respectively, based on records from southern latitudes. Roper & Jereb (2010:121) give a maximum weight of up to 500 kg (1,100 lb), and "possibly greater". Discredited weights of as much as a tonne (2,200 lb) or more are not uncommon in older literature (see e.g. #22, 114, and 117).

The giant squid and the distantly related colossal squid (Mesonychoteuthis hamiltoni) are recognised as having by far the largest eyes of any living animal, and comparable to the largest eyes known from the fossil record. Historical reports of "dinner plate–sized" eyes (e.g. #37) are largely corroborated by modern measurements, with an accepted maximum diameter of at least 27 cm (11 in) and a 9 cm (3.5 in) pupil (based on #248).

=== Species identifications ===
Undoubtedly several imperfectly distinguished forms have been included in the earlier anecdotal records of Architeuthis. Moreover, specimens of Architeuthis (the Giant Squid par excellence), the smaller Sthenoteuthis, and possibly Ommatostrephes have been indiscriminately described as "Giant Squids."

— Guy Coburn Robson, from his description of Architeuthis clarkei, a species he erected in 1933 based on a carcass (#107) that washed ashore in Scarborough, England, earlier that year

The taxonomy of the giant squid genus Architeuthis has not been entirely resolved. Lumpers and splitters may propose as many as eight species or as few as one, with most authors recognising either one cosmopolitan species (A. dux) or three geographically disparate species: A. dux from the Atlantic, A. martensi from the North Pacific, and A. sanctipauli from the Southern Ocean. Historically, some twenty species names (not counting new combinations) and eight genus names have been applied to architeuthids (see Type specimens). No genetic or physical basis for distinguishing between the named species has been proposed, though specimens from the North Pacific do not appear to reach the maximum dimensions seen in giant squid from other areas. There may also be regional differences in the relative proportions of the tentacles and their sucker counts. The mitogenomic analysis of Winkelmann et al. (2013) supports the existence of a single, globally distributed species (A. dux). The same conclusion was reached by Förch (1998) on the basis of morphological data.

The literature on giant squid has been further muddied by the frequent misattribution of various squid specimens to the genus Architeuthis, often based solely on their large size. In the academic literature alone, such misidentifications encompass at least the oegopsid families Chiroteuthidae (misidentification #[8]—Asperoteuthis lui), Cranchiidae (#[5] and [6]—Mesonychoteuthis hamiltoni), Ommastrephidae (#[1]—Sthenoteuthis pteropus and #[2]—Dosidicus gigas), Onychoteuthidae (#[7], [11], and [13]—Onykia robusta), and Psychroteuthidae (#[4]—indeterminate species), with the familial identity of one record remaining unresolved (#[3]). Many more misidentifications have been propagated in the popular press, involving—among others—Megalocranchia cf. fisheri (#[12]; Cranchiidae), Thysanoteuthis rhombus (#[10]; Thysanoteuthidae), and an egg mass of Nototodarus gouldi (#[9]; Ommastrephidae). This situation is further confused by the occasional usage of the common name 'giant squid' in reference to large squids of other genera. (Note: In particular, the commercially important Humboldt squid (Dosidicus gigas) is sometimes called 'giant squid' (or its Spanish equivalent calamar gigante) and this, together with its large size, has led to confusion with Architeuthis (e.g. misidentification #[2]). In February 2002, the Manhattan-based seafood restaurant Esca offered what was claimed to be Architeuthis, but the ammonia-free flesh turned out to be that of the Humboldt squid.)

== List of giant squid ==
=== Sourcing and progenitors ===
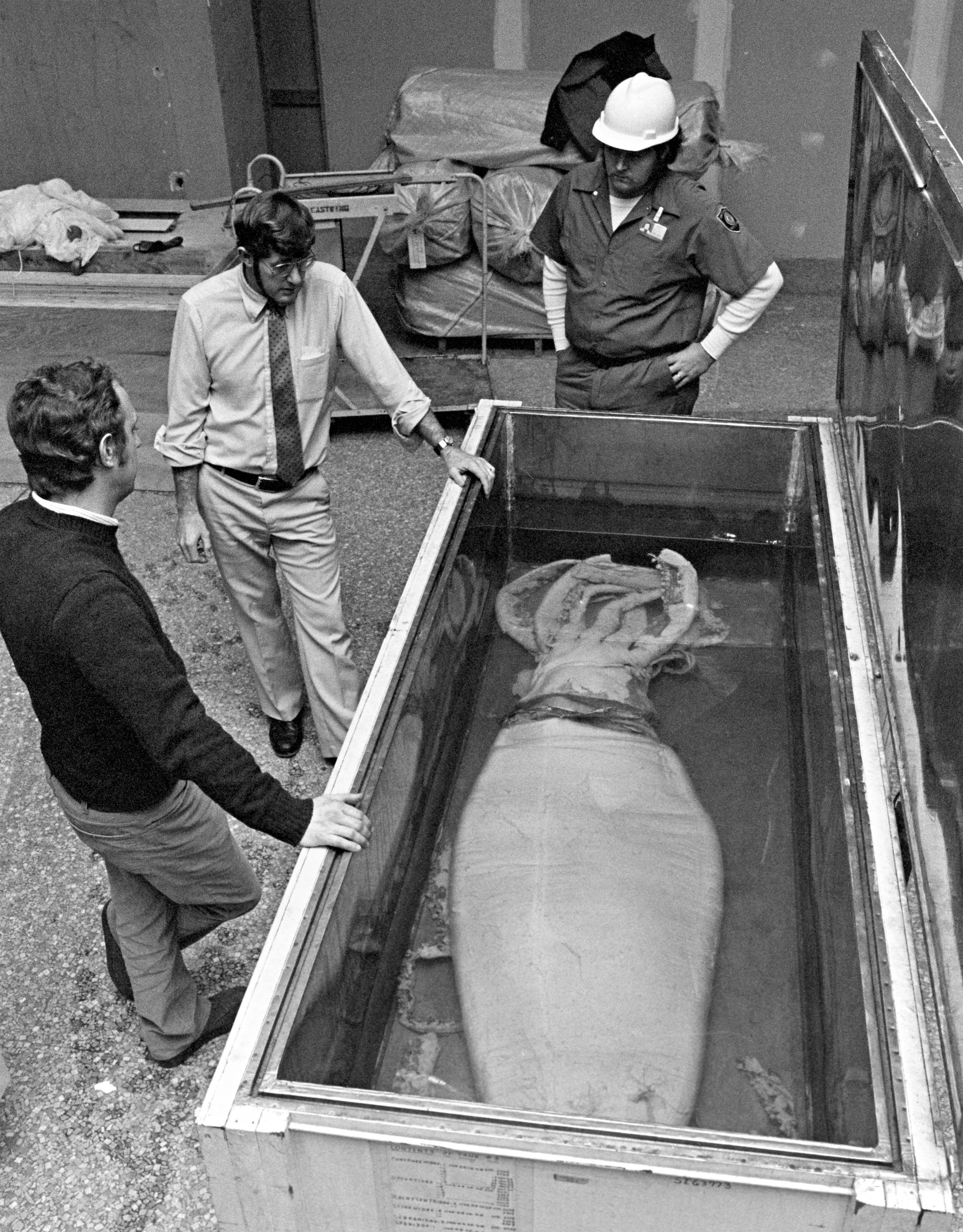
Michael J. Sweeney (left) and Clyde F. E. Roper (center) with a giant squid (#240) being prepared for display at the National Museum of Natural History in 1983. Sweeney compiled the list on which the present one is based; Roper, one of the foremost experts on Architeuthis, wrote its introduction.

The present list generally follows "Records of Architeuthis Specimens from Published Reports", compiled by zoologist Michael J. Sweeney of the Smithsonian Institution and including records through 1999, with additional information taken from other sources (see Full citations). While Sweeney's list is sourced almost entirely from the scientific literature, many of the more recent specimens are supported by reports from the news media, including newspapers and magazines, radio and television broadcasts, and online sources.

Earlier efforts to compile a list of all known giant squid encounters throughout history include those of marine writer and artist Richard Ellis. Ellis's first list, published as an appendix to his 1994 work Monsters of the Sea, was probably the first such compilation to appear in print and was described in the book's table of contents as "the most complete and accurate list of the historical sightings and strandings of Architeuthis ever attempted". Ellis's much-expanded second list, an appendix to his 1998 book The Search for the Giant Squid, comprised 166 entries spanning four and a half centuries, from 1545 to 1996. Records which appear in Ellis's 1998 list but are not found in Sweeney & Roper's 2001 list have a citation to Ellis (1998a)—in the page range 257–265—in the 'Additional references' column of the main table. (Note: One record given by Ellis is omitted from the present list: Ellis (1998a:259) lists a specimen supposedly collected "[n]orth of Bahamas" in 1898, citing Steenstrup (1898), but this appears to stem from confusion with the type specimen of Architeuthis dux (#14), collected off the Bahamas in 1855.)

In addition to these global specimen lists, a number of regional compilations have been published, including Clarke & Robson (1929:156), Rees (1950:39–40) and Collins (1998) for the British Isles; Sivertsen (1955) for Norway; Aldrich (1991) for Newfoundland; Okiyama (1993) for the Sea of Japan; Förch (1998:105–110) for New Zealand; Guerra et al. (2006:258–259) for Asturias, Spain; [TMAG] (2007:18–21) for Tasmania, Australia; and Roper et al. (2015) for the western North Atlantic. Works exhaustively enumerating all recorded specimens from a particular mass appearance event include those of Verrill (1882c) for Newfoundland in 1870–1881 and Kubodera et al. (2016) for the Sea of Japan in 2014–2015. Though the number of authenticated giant squid records now runs into the hundreds, individual specimens still generate considerable scientific interest and continue to have scholarly papers unto themselves.

=== Scope and inclusion criteria ===
The list includes records of giant squid (genus Architeuthis) either supported by a physical specimen (or parts thereof) or—in the absence of any saved material—where at least one of the following conditions is satisfied: the specimen was examined by an expert prior to disposal and thereby positively identified as a giant squid; a photograph or video recording of the specimen was taken, on the basis of which it was assigned to the genus Architeuthis by a recognised authority; or the record was accepted as being that of a giant squid by a contemporary expert or later authority for any other reason, such as the perceived credibility of the source or the verisimilitude of the account.

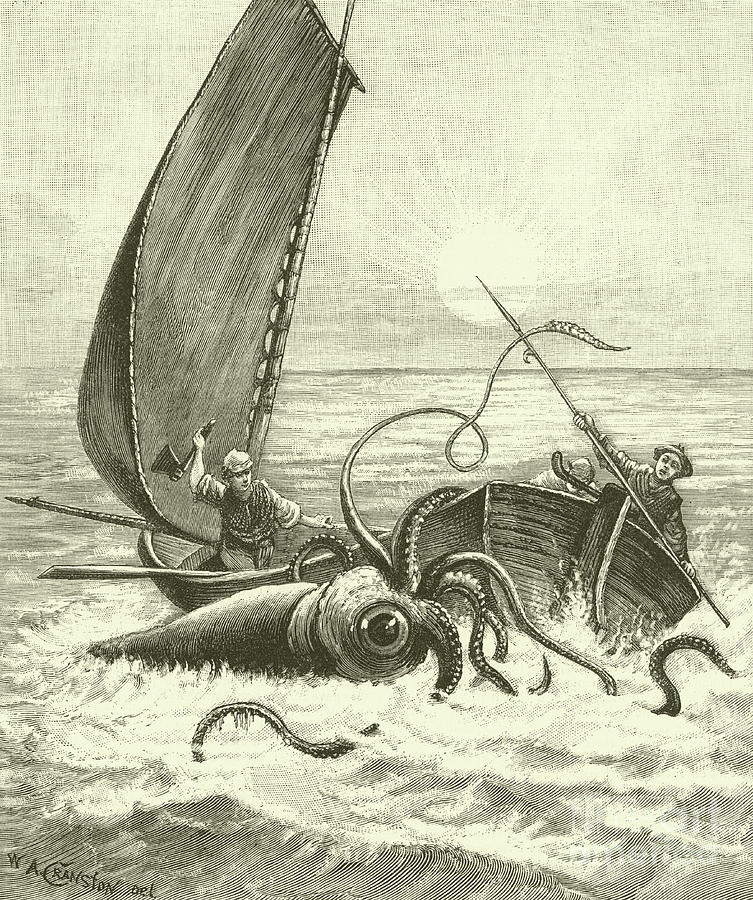
Nineteenth century engraving by W. A. Cranston of a giant squid attacking a boat (see #29). Only sightings deemed authentic by published experts are included in the list.

Purported sightings of giant squid lacking both physical and documentary evidence and expert appraisal are generally excluded, with the exception of those appearing in the lists of Ellis (1994a:379–384), Ellis (1998a:257–265), or Sweeney & Roper (2001) (see e.g. "attacks" of #32 and 106). (Note: Published purported giant squid sightings thus excluded include those of J. D. Starkey from World War II; Dennis Braun from 1969; Jacques Cousteau (reported in 1973); Tim Lipington from 1994; C. A. McDowall (reported in 1998); Gordon Robertson (reported in 2013); and the "Giant Squid Found" MonsterQuest episode of 2007. Likewise excluded are two sightings off Suffolk, England, both tentatively attributed to Architeuthis: the first a group sighting off Pakefield Gat on 29 October 1896 and the other an individual off Southwold on 20 October 1938. Also excluded are reported sightings of giant squid engaged in surface "battles" with whales, such as that supposedly witnessed by a whaler c. 1875; from a Soviet whaling ship in 1965; from Danger Point Lighthouse, South Africa, in 1966; and that supposedly seen and photographed from USS San Pablo around 120–140 miles (190–230 km) off Cape Bonavista, Newfoundland, also in 1966 (the resulting photos were reportedly "quite unsatisfactory"). The squid–whale battles described in Frank Thomas Bullen's The Cruise of the Cachalot (1898) and E. J. Pratt's The Cachalot (1926) have at times also been claimed to be based on true events. Also excluded are supposed wartime encounters with giant squid, including off The Narrows, Newfoundland, and Dieppe, France, and the giant squid that reportedly attacked survivors of SS Britannia after it was sunk by a German merchant raider in 1941. Supposed specimens thus excluded include Charles H. Dudoward's 1892 and 1922 carcasses (variously described as octopuses or squid); the so-called St. Augustine Monster of 1896 (initially postulated by A. E. Verrill to be a giant squid, later a gigantic octopus, and eventually shown to be the remains of a whale); other "blobs" and "globsters" variously speculated to be giant squid; the whale-vomited giant limb fragment mentioned in Willy Ley's 1959 book Exotic Zoology; two 42-foot (13 m) long tentacles said to have been vomited by an aquarium-bound whale; and the giant suckers supposedly recovered from sperm whale stomachs mentioned by Frederick Aldrich. Also excluded are a number of enormous tentacles mentioned by Pierre Denys de Montfort, based on interviews with whalers and sea captains, including one 35 feet (11 m) long recovered from the mouth of a sperm whale as told by American whaler Ben Johnson; another 45 feet (14 m) long found alongside a slaughtered whale as recalled by another American whaler by the name of Reynolds; a 25-foot (7.6 m) portion (the whole tentacle was said to be around 35–40 feet [11–12 m] long) hacked off during an attack off the West African coast according to Danish captain Jean-Magnus Dens; and captain Anderson's recollection of finding a pair of 25-foot (7.6 m) tentacles "still connected by part of the mantle" on rocks near Bergen, Norway. Frost (1934:103), citing the 21 December 1933 issue of The Evening Telegram of St. John's, mentioned that Hon. Capt. A. Kean claimed he had found a giant squid at Flowers Cove "measuring 72 feet [22 m] from tip to tip, and almost dead", more than 50 years earlier. Similarly, Bright (1989:149) mentioned that a "specimen found at Flower's Cove on the Newfoundland coast in 1934 [sic] was positively identified and measured" at 22 m, and Kilias (1993:610) wrote of a specimen from Flowers Cove supposedly measuring 21.95 m. A similar length of 23 m is sometimes attributed to a purported 1933 stranding from Australia. There also exists a report of a specimen from Portugal Cove, Newfoundland, said to have been spotted in 1817 by a local minister named Larveige and named after him. These records are likewise excluded due to a lack of substantiating evidence. — In addition to the above, the size of the squid that allegedly damaged the ship USS Stein is uncertain. In 1978, the ship was attacked by something in the open sea (Pacific Ocean). Later, when the sailors reached shore, they found that the rubber coating of the ship's sonar dome had been damaged several times. Almost all of the cuts contained the remains of sharp, curved claws, which were found on the edges of the suction cups of some squid tentacles. The claws were much larger than any squid claws discovered at the time. Some have speculated that the attack was by a giant squid, up to 45 meters long.) In particular, "sea monster" sightings—many of which have been attributed to giant squid by various authors—fall short of this standard. (Note: The giant squid has long been mooted as a possible explanation for "sea monster" sightings, including most famously the kraken, but also various "sea serpents", such as the one purportedly seen off Greenland in 1734 and later reported by Hans Egede; that sighted in Romsdalsfjord, Norway, in 1845; that spotted by the crew of HMS Daedalus in 1848; that encountered by HMS Plumper later the same year; that allegedly observed battling a whale from the barque Pauline in 1875; and two reported near Wollongong, New South Wales, Australia, in 1930: off Bellambi and two weeks later off Scarborough. Older examples occasionally attributed to the giant squid include the hydra from Conrad Gessner's Historia Animalium of 1555; the "monstrous fish" from Olaus Magnus's Historia de Gentibus Septentrionalibus of the same year (later reprinted by authors such as Gessner, Edward Topsell, Ulisse Aldrovandi, and John Jonston); and various mythological and folkloric creatures such as the Greek Scylla, the Japanese Akkorokamui and umibōzu, the Māori Te Wheke-a-Muturangi, and the Caribbean Lusca. Giant squid have even, on occasion, been proposed as an explanation for the Loch Ness Monster, with the obvious problem that all living cephalopods are exclusively marine. Some authors have cautioned against attributing "sea monster" sightings to giant squid and offered alternative explanations.) Compositing and other forms of photo manipulation have been used to perpetrate hoaxes involving giant squid and these are occasionally circulated as records of actual news events, often accompanied by fictional background stories. Such records are likewise excluded, as are speculative misidentifications with no scientific basis.

The earliest surviving records of very large squid date to classical antiquity and the writings of Aristotle, Pliny the Elder, and possibly Antipater of Sidon. But in the absence of detailed descriptions or surviving remains, it is not possible to assign these to the giant squid genus Architeuthis with any confidence, and they are therefore not included in this list (in any case, giant squid records from the Mediterranean are exceedingly rare). Basque and Portuguese cod fishermen observed what were likely giant squid carcasses in the waters of the Grand Banks of Newfoundland as early as the 16th century, but conclusive evidence is similarly lacking. The earliest specimens identifiable as true giant squid are generally accepted to be ones from the early modern period in the 17th and 18th centuries, and possibly as far back as the 16th century (#1).

All developmental stages from hatchling to mature adult are included. In the literature there is a single anecdotal account of a giant squid "egg case", but this is excluded due to a lack of substantiating evidence (see misidentification #[9] for possible egg mass later determined to be that of the arrow squid, Nototodarus gouldi). Indirect evidence of giant squid—such as sucker scars found on sperm whales—falls outside the scope of this list.

Specimens misassigned to the genus Architeuthis in print publications or news reports are included, but are clearly highlighted as misidentifications.

=== List of specimens ===
Records are listed chronologically in ascending order and numbered accordingly. This numbering is not meant to be definitive but rather to provide a convenient means of referring to individual records. Specimens incorrectly assigned to the genus Architeuthis are counted separately, their numbers enclosed in square brackets, and are highlighted in pink ( ). Records that cover multiple whole specimens, or remains necessarily originating from multiple individuals (e.g. two lower beaks), have the 'Material cited' cell highlighted in grey ( ). Animals that were photographed or filmed while alive (all from the 21st century) have the 'Nature of encounter' cell highlighted in yellow ( ). Where a record falls into more than one of these categories, a combination of shadings is used. Where an image of a specimen is available, this is indicated by a camera symbol (📷) that links to the image.

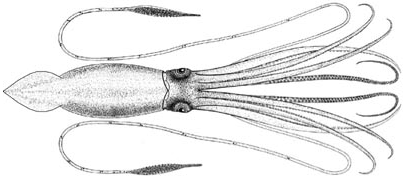
Giant squid (Architeuthis dux), modified from an illustration by Addison Emery Verrill (Verrill, 1880a: pl. 20; based on #42), showing the exceptionally long feeding tentacles, which are often missing or damaged in recovered specimens. Some of the more extreme published giant squid measurements have been attributed to artificial lengthening of these tentacles. Almost the entire bulk of the animal—that is, the mantle, head, and arms—takes up less than half of its total length; the absence of the tentacles, therefore, has a great effect on the animal's total length but very little on its mass.

- **Date** – Date on which the specimen was first captured, found, or observed. Where this is unknown, the date on which the specimen was first reported is listed instead and noted as such. All times are local.
- **Location** – Area where the specimen was encountered, including coordinates and depth information where available. Given as it appears in the cited reference(s), except where additional information is provided in square brackets. The quadrant of a major ocean in which the specimen was found is given in curly brackets (e.g. {NEA}; see Oceanic sectors).
- **Nature of encounter** – Circumstances in which the specimen was recovered or observed. Given as they appear in the cited reference(s), although "washed ashore" encompasses all stranded animals.
- **Identification** – Species- or genus-level taxon to which the specimen was assigned. Given as it appears in the cited reference(s). Listed chronologically if specimen was re-identified. These designations are primarily of historical interest as most authorities now recognise a single species of giant squid: Architeuthis dux. Where only a vernacular name has been applied to the specimen (e.g. "giant squid" or a non-English equivalent), this is given instead.
- **Material cited** – Original specimen material that was recovered or observed. "Entire" encompasses all more-or-less complete specimens. Names of anatomical features are retained from original sources (e.g. "jaws" may be given instead of the preferred "beak", or "body" instead of "mantle"). The specimen's state of preservation is also given, where known, and any missing parts enumerated (the tentacles, arm tips, reddish skin and eyes are the parts most often missing in stranded specimens, owing to their delicate nature and/or preferential targeting by scavengers).
- **Material saved** – Material that was kept after examination and not discarded (if any). Information may be derived from outdated sources; material may no longer be extant even if stated as such.
- **Sex** – Sex and sexual maturity of the specimen.
- **Size and measurements** – Data relating to measurements and counts. Abbreviations used are based on standardised acronyms in teuthology (see Measurements), with the exception of several found in older references. Measurements are given as they appear in the cited reference(s), with both arithmetic precision and original units preserved (metric conversions are shown alongside imperial measurements), though some of the more extreme lengths and weights found in older literature have since been discredited.
- **Repository** – Institution in which the specimen material is deposited (based on cited sources; may not be current), including accession numbers where available. Institutional acronyms are those defined by Leviton et al. (1985) and Leviton & Gibbs (1988) (see Repositories). Where the acronym is unknown, the full repository name is listed. Type specimens, such as holotypes or syntypes, are identified as such in boldface. If an author has given a specimen a unique identifying number (e.g. Verrill specimen No. 28), this is included as well, whether or not the specimen is extant.
- **Main references** – The most important sources, typically ones that provide extensive data and/or analysis on a particular specimen (often primary sources). Presented in author–date parenthetical referencing style, with page numbers included where applicable (those in square brackets refer either to unpaginated works or English translations of originally non-English works; see Full citations). Only the first page of relevant coverage is given, except where this is discontinuous. Any relevant figures ("figs.") and plates ("pls.") are enumerated.
- **Additional references** – References of lesser importance or primacy, either because they provide less substantive information on a given record (often secondary sources), or else because they are not easily obtainable or possibly even extant (e.g. old newspaper articles, personal correspondence, and television broadcasts) but nonetheless mentioned in more readily accessible published works (see Full citations).
- Notes – Miscellaneous information, often including persons and vessels involved in the specimen's recovery and subsequent handling, and any dissections, preservation work or scientific analyses carried out on the specimen. Where animals have been recorded while alive this is also noted. Material not referable to the genus Architeuthis, as well as specimens on public display, are both highlighted in bold (as "Non-architeuthid" and "On public display", respectively), though the latter information may no longer be current.

The total number of giant squid records listed across this page and successive lists is 714, though the number of individual animals covered is greater (the additional number exceeding 250) as some records encompass multiple specimens (indicated in grey). Additionally, 13 records relate to specimens misidentified as giant squid (indicated in pink).

#	Date	Location	Nature of encounter	Identification	Material cited	Material saved	Sex	Size and measurements	Repository	Main references	Additional references	Notes
1 (📷)	c. 1546 (Note: Early sources variously give the date as 1545, 1546, December 1549, or 1550. Lycosthenes (1557) mentions three "sea monks" supposedly found in 1530, 1546, and 1549, the first in the Rhine and the latter two near Copenhagen (possibly referring to the same specimen). The earliest known source, a German woodcut of the creature dating from 1546—according to which the event happened the same year—places an upper bound on the date, and Paxton & Holland (2005) consider 1546 to be the most likely year.)	Øresund, near Malmö, Denmark–Norway [since 1658 Malmö has been part of Sweden] {NEA}	Found washed ashore; "caught live"	"sea monk"; Architeuthis monachus Steenstrup in Harting, 1860; Jenny Haniver made from a skate; Squatina squatina (angelshark)	Entire?	Undetermined		?WL: ≈3 m		Hamer (1546:[1], fig.); Belon (1553:38, fig.); Rondelet (1554:492, fig.); Belon (1555:32, fig.); Lycosthenes (1557:609, fig.); Gessner (1558:519, fig.); Rondelet (1558:361, fig.); Sluperius (1572:"89", 105, fig.); Vedel (1575); Huitfeldt ([1595]:1545); Gessner (1604:438, fig.); Stephanius ([c. 1650]:344); Steenstrup (1855a:63, 3 figs.); Roeleveld & Knudsen (1980:293, 3 figs.); Ellis (1998a:60, fig.); Paxton & Holland (2005:39, fig. 1)	records of Björn Jónsson á Skarðsá; (Note: Mentioned by Steenstrup (1855a:78), presumably referring to Jónsson's encyclopedic Annálar Björns á Skarðsá, covering the history of Iceland from 1400 to 1645, which was eventually published as a dual Icelandic–Latin work in 1774–1775.) Scheuchzer (1716:153); Holberg (1733:379); Lönnberg (1891:36); Nordgård (1928:71); Tambs-Lyche (1946:288); Carrington (1957:58, fig.); Muus (1959:170); Russell & Russell (1975:94); Strauss (1975:393, fig.); Aldrich (1980:55); Roeleveld (N.d.)	Contemporaneously regarded as a "sea monk". Drawings of animal sent by Christian III of Denmark to Holy Roman Emperor Charles V (then in Spain) sometime between 1545 and 1550; specimen well known across Europe. Mentioned in the writings of 16th-century naturalists Pierre Belon, Guillaume Rondelet, and Conrad Gesner (in his encyclopedic Historia Animalium), though giant squid identity first proposed by Japetus Steenstrup in lecture on 26 November 1854. Paxton & Holland (2005:39) concluded that the specimen "was unlikely to have been a giant squid [...] The most likely alternative suspect would be the angelshark Squatina squatina". The similar sea bishop has also been interpreted as a giant squid carcass or else a Jenny Haniver made from a skate.
2	autumn 1639	Thingøre Sand, Nordresyssel (or Thingøresand, Hunevandsyssel), Iceland {NEA}	Found washed ashore	Architeuthis sp.	Entire	One arm		BL+HL: ≈6 ft (1.8 m); AL: ≈3 ft (0.91 m); TL: ≈16–18 ft (4.9–5.5 m); BC: ≈3–4 ft (0.91–1.22 m)	Thingøre monastery; "museum at Copenhagen" (ZMUC?)	Jónsson ([c. 1645]:238); Ólafsson (1772:716); Steenstrup (1849:950/[9]); Steenstrup (1898:425/[272]); Ellis (1998a:65)	Packard (1873:87); Verrill (1875b:84); Robson (1933:691); Muus (1959:170); Berger (2009:260)	Original Icelandic account is from the contemporaneous Annálar Björns á Skarðsá and has been translated into English. (Note: It reads: "In the autumn [of 1639] on Thingøresand in Hunevandsyssel a peculiar creature or sea monster was stranded with length and thickness like those of a man; it had 7 tails, and each of these measured approximately two ells. These tails were densely covered with a kind of button, and the buttons looked as if there was an eye ball in each button, and round the eye ball an eyelid; these eyelids looked as if they were gilded. On this sea monster there was in addition a single tail which had grown out above those 7 tails; it was extremely long, 4–5 fms [7.5–9.4 m]; no bone or cartilage were found in its body but the whole to the sight and to the touch was like the soft belly of the female lumpfish [Cyclopterus lumpus]. No trace was seen of the head, except the one aperture, or two, which were found behind the tails or at a short distance from them. This very creature was observed by many trustworthy men, and one of the tails of the sea monster was brought home to Thingørekloster for examination.") Crude drawing of animal mentioned by Eggert Ólafsson was lost with most of his books when his boat capsized off Iceland in 1768, leading to his death. Identified by Japetus Steenstrup as decapod cephalopod in 1849.
3 (📷)	c. 15 October 1673	Dingle-I-cosh, Kerry, Ireland {NEA}	Found floating at surface, in process of washing ashore, alive	Dinoteuthis proboscideus More, 1875; Architeuthis monachus; Ommastrephes (Architeuthis) monachus	Entire	Two arms, buccal mass, and suckers taken to Dublin		TL: ≈11 ft (3.4 m) + 9 ft (2.7 m); AL: ≈6–8 ft (1.8–2.4 m); "liver": 30 lb (14 kg)	Undetermined [NMI?]; **holotype** of Dinoteuthis proboscideus More, 1875	[Anon.] (c. 1673); Hooke et al. (c. 1674:[1], fig.); More (1875a:4526); Verrill (1875c:214); Tryon (1879b:185); Ellis (1998a:66); Sueur-Hermel (2017:64)	More (1875b:4571); Massy (1909:30); Ritchie (1918:137); Robson (1933:692); Rees (1950:40); Hardy (1956:285); Collins (1998:489)	Found by James Steward. Original material relating to this specimen consists of: a broadsheet printed in London with three letters (two from Thomas Hooke and one from Thomas Clear) together with a description and illustration; a fourth letter in manuscript; a broadsheet printed in Dublin to be distributed as a handbill; and an eight-page booklet printed in London with a woodcut reproduction of the illustration in the broadsheet (both originating from a painting on canvas brought to London, as it was impossible to preserve the carcass).
4	1680	Ulvangen Fjord, Alstadhoug parish, Norway {NEA}	Not stated		Entire?					Pontoppidan (1753:344)	Steenstrup (1857:184/[18]); Grieg (1933:19)	
5	1770	Jutland, Denmark {NEA}						Unknown		Muss (1959)	Ellis (1998a:257)	
6	27 May 1785	Grand Banks, Newfoundland {NWA}	Found floating at surface, dead	Architeuthis sp.				BL: 7 ft (2.1 m)		Cartwright (1792:44); Thomas ([1795]:183); Aldrich (1991:457)		Found during George Cartwright's sixth and final voyage to Newfoundland and Labrador. Spotted at 10 am surrounded by birds. Head broke off during retrieval. Described as "a large squid [...] when gutted, the body filled a pork barrel, and the whole of it would have filled a tierce".
7	November or December 1790	Arnarnaesvik, Modruvalle, Iceland {NEA}	Found washed ashore		Entire	None; used for cod bait		"longest tentacula": >3 fathoms (5.5 m); "body right from the head": 3.5 fathoms (6.4 m); "so thick that a fullgrown man could hardly embrace it with his arms"		Steenstrup (1849:952/[11]); Steenstrup (1898:429/[276]); Ellis (1998a:68)	February 1792 diary of Sveinn Pálsson (in library of Icelandic Literary Society, in Copenhagen); Verrill (1875b:84); Robson (1933:691)	Called Kolkrabbe ('coal-crab') by local people. Identified by Japetus Steenstrup as decapod cephalopod in 1849.
8	1700s (reported 1795)	Freshwater Bay, near mouth of St. John's harbour, Newfoundland {NWA}	Unknown	Architeuthis sp.						Thomas ([1795]:183); Aldrich (1991:457)		
9	1700s	Grand Banks, Newfoundland {NWA}	Unknown	Architeuthis sp.						Aldrich (1991:457)		
10	1798	north coast of Denmark {NEA}	Not stated	"gigantic squid"				Unknown	"museum at Copenhagen" (ZMUC?)	Packard (1873:87)	Ellis (1998a:257)	
11	9 January 1802	off Tasmania, Australia {SWP}	Found at surface, alive	?Loligo ["vraisemblablement du genre Calmar [Loligo, Lamarck]"]				"size of a barrel" ["grosseur d'un tonneau"]; AL: 1.9–2.2 m; AD: 18–21 cm		Péron (1807:216)	Quoy & Gaimard (1824:411); Ellis (1998a:257)	Péron (1807:216) wrote: "it rolled with noise in the midst of the waves, and its long arms, stretched out on their surface, stirred like so many enormous reptiles" (translated from the French).
12	between 1817 and 1820	Atlantic Ocean, near equator {?}	Found floating at surface	"énorme calmar"	Partial remains; "tentacles" ("tentacules") missing			WT: 100 "livres" [estimate]; WT: 200 "livres" [estimate; if complete]		Quoy & Gaimard (1824:411)	Packard (1873:88); Ellis (1998a:257)	Found at surface in calm weather. Quoy & Gaimard (1824:411) opined: "it is easy to imagine that one of these terrible molluscs could readily remove a man from a fairly large boat, but not a medium-tonnage vessel, still less tilting this vessel and endangering it, as some would like to believe" (translated from the French).
13 (📷)	December 1853	Raabjerg beach, North Jutland, coast of Skagerack, Denmark {NEA}	Found washed ashore	Architeuthis monachus	Entire	Jaws only; radula discarded after poor preservation; jaws cut out; portion used for bait; remainder buried after 2 days		WT: 80–85 kg; jaw measurements Steenstrup (1898:423/[270])	ZMUC catalog no. CEP-133; **holotype** of Architeuthis monachus Steenstrup, 1857	Steenstrup (1855b:[14]); Harting (1860:11); Steenstrup (1898:415/[258], pl. 1 figs. 1–2); Kristensen & Knudsen (1983:222)	Steenstrup (1857:[18]); Packard (1873:87); Gervais (1875:91); Verrill (1875b:84); Verrill (1880a:238, pl. 25 fig. 3); Verrill (1882c:51, pl. 12 fig. 3); Posselt (1890:144); Nordgård (1928:71)	"Architeuthis monachus" Steenstrup = nomen nudum
14 (📷)	5 November 1855	western Atlantic Ocean, near Bahamas (31°N 76°W) {NWA}	Not stated; presumably found floating at surface	Architeuthis dux Steenstrup, 1857; Architeuthis titan	Various parts	Gladius, mouthparts, part of arm, several suckers, and what may be hectocotylus	Male	WL: 377 cm; AL: 1/2 whole length; beak measurements; GL: 6 ft (1.8 m)	ZMUC catalog no. CEP-97 (or CEP-000097) and NHMD-77320 (multiple parts, each in its own glass vessel: gladius, mouthparts, part of arm, several suckers, and what may be hectocotylus); **holotype** of Architeuthis dux Steenstrup, 1857; ZMB Moll. 34798 (single sucker); piece of limb in Bergen Museum	Steenstrup (1857:[18]); Steenstrup (1882:[160]); Steenstrup (1898:413, 450/[260, 298], pls. 3–4); Tryon (1879b:186, pl. 86 fig. 388); Kristensen & Knudsen (1983:222); Glaubrecht & Salcedo-Vargas (2000:273); [NHMD] (2019)	Packard (1873:87); Verrill (1875b:84); Posselt (1890:144); Toll & Hess (1981:753)	Obtained by Capt. Vilhelm Hygom. Japetus Steenstrup donated single sucker to Museum für Naturkunde in Berlin, which was incorporated into collection in 1883 according to catalogue entry. Preserved in 70% ethanol.
15	December 1855	Aalbaekbugten, Denmark {NEA}	Found washed ashore	Architeuthis sp.	Entire?	Undetermined		None		Muus (1959:170)	Posselt (1890:144)	
16 (📷)	Unknown (reported 1860)	Unknown {?}	Not stated	Architeuthis dux;?Ommastrephes hartingii; Architeuthis hartingii (Verrill, 1875); nomen nudum	Jaws, buccal mass, detached arm suckers	Jaws, buccal mass, detached arm suckers		ASD: 1.05 in (2.7 cm)	Utrecht University Natural History Museum; **holotype** of Loligo hartingii Verrill, 1875. Harting specimen No. 1	Harting (1860:2, pl. 1); Kent (1874d:491); Verrill (1875b:85, fig. 28); Tryon (1879b:149, 184, pl. 60 figs. 194–195); Verrill (1880a:240, pl. 16 fig. 8, pl. 25 fig. 1); Verrill (1882c:52, pl. 12 figs. 1–1c); Pfeffer (1912:37)	Dell (1970:27)	
17	1860 or 1861	between Hillswick and Scalloway, Shetland, Scotland {NEA}	Found washed ashore	Architeuthis monachus Steenstrup, 1857; Architeuthis dux Steenstrup, 1857		Undetermined		TL: 16 ft (4.9 m); AL: ≈8 ft (2.4 m); BL: ≈7 ft (2.1 m)		Jeffreys (1869:124); Stephen (1944:263)	More (1875b:4571); Pfeffer (1912:26); Rees (1950:40); Collins (1998:489)	
18 (📷)	30 November ?1861 [=1860 Rees & Maul]	about 20 miles (32 km) northeast of Teneriffe, Canary Islands {NEA}	Found floating at surface	Loligo bouyeri;?Ommastrephes bouyeri	Entire, decomposed	None		BL: 15–18 ft (4.6–5.5 m)	None	Bouyer (1861:1263); Crosse & Fischer (1862:135); Bouyer (1866:275, fig.); Kent (1874a:180); Verrill (1875b:86); Tryon (1879b:149, 184, pl. 59); Bourée (1912:113, fig. 108); Aldrich (1978:2); Ellis (1998a:5, 78); Heuvelmans (2003:185, figs. 95–96, 100)	Frédol (1865:314, pl. 13); Figuier (1866:464, fig. 362); Frédol (1866:362); Mangin (1868:321); Meunier (1871:245); Kent (1874d:491); Gervais (1875:93); Lee (1883:38, fig. 8); Rees & Maul (1956:266); Carrington (1957:53, pl. 3b); Muntz (1995:19, fig. 11); Lagrange (2009:19)	Observed only by officers of the French gunboat Alecton; sketch made. A report of the incident filed by the ship's lieutenant was almost certainly seen by Jules Verne and adapted by him for the description of the monstrous squid in Twenty Thousand Leagues Under the Seas. Iconography discussed by Lagrange (2009).
19	1862	North Atlantic {NEA/NWA}						Unknown		Crosse & Fischer (1862)	Ellis (1998a:258)	
[1] (📷)	Unknown; 1870?	Cape Sable, Nova Scotia, Canada {NWA}	Found washed ashore	Architeuthis megaptera Verrill, 1878 [=Sthenoteuthis pteropus (Steenstrup, 1855)]	Entire	Entire		BL: 14 in (36 cm); BL+HL: 19 in (48 cm); EL: 43 in (110 cm); TL: 22–24 in (56–61 cm); AL: 6.5–8.5 in (17–22 cm); FW: 13.5 in (34 cm); FL: 6 in (15 cm); extensive additional measurements	NSMC catalog no. 1870-Z-2; YPM catalog nos. IZ 017932 (sucker) & IZ 017713; **holotype** of Architeuthis megaptera Verrill, 1878; Verrill specimen No. 21 ("Cape Sable specimen")	Verrill (1878:207); Tryon (1879b:187); Verrill (1880a:193, pl. 21); Verrill (1882c:17, pl. 16 figs. 1–9)		**Non-architeuthid.** Collected by J.M. Jones.
20	September 1870	Waimarama, east coast of Wellington, New Zealand {SWP}	Found washed ashore		Entire	Beak		BL+HL: 10 ft 5 in (3.18 m); BC: 6 ft (1.8 m); AL: 5 ft 6 in (1.68 m)	In Kirk's possession; Kirk specimen No. 1	Kirk (1880:310); Verrill (1881b:398)	Meinertzhagen letter 27 June 1879 to Kirk; Pfeffer (1912:32); Dell (1952:98)	Mr. Meinertzhagen sent beak, saved by third party (unidentified), to Kirk. Natives called specimen a "taniwha".
21	1870 (winter)	Lamaline, Newfoundland {NWA}	Found washed ashore	Architeuthis monachus of Steenstrup	Two specimens; entire?	None?; used as fish bait		Two; EL: 40 ft (12 m) and EL: 47 ft (14 m)	None?; Verrill specimen Nos. 8 & 9 ("Lamaline specimens")	Murray (1874a:162); Verrill (1875a:36); Verrill (1880a:187); Verrill (1882c:11)	Boston Traveller, November 1873; Harvey (1874a:69); Kent (1874a:182); Frost (1934:101); Earle (1977:52)	Data from Mr. Harvey letter citing Rev. M. Gabriel's statement to Harvey.
22 (📷)	October 1871	Grand Banks, Newfoundland {NWA}	Found floating at surface	Architeuthis princeps Verrill, 1875	Entire; part used as bait	Jaws obtained from Baird for examination by Verrill		BL: ≈15 ft (4.6 m); BD: 19 in (48 cm); AL: ≈10 ft (3.0 m) [mutilated]; AD: 7 in (18 cm); AC: 22 in (56 cm); beak; BC: 4 ft 8 in (1.42 m); WT: 2,000 lb (910 kg)	Jaws at NMNH (no longer extant?); lower jaw is **syntype** of Architeuthis princeps Verrill, 1875b; Verrill specimen No. 1 ("Grand Banks specimen" [1st])	Packard (1873:91); Verrill (1874a:158); Verrill (1874b:167); Verrill (1875b:79, fig. 27); Verrill (1880a:181, 210, pl. 18 fig. 3); Verrill (1882c:5, pl. 11 figs. 3–3a)	Pfeffer (1912:20); Frost (1934:100)	Taken by Capt. Campbell, Schooner B.D. Haskins.
23	1871	Wellington, New Zealand {SWP}						?EL: 16 ft (4.9 m)		Dell (1952)	Ellis (1998a:258)	
24	1872 (autumn or winter)	Coomb's Cove, Fortune Bay, Newfoundland {NWA}	Found alive in shallow water, having been driven ashore in heavy sea		Entire; "one long arm missing" (later changed to both present)			BL: 10 ft (3.0 m); BD: 3–4 ft (0.91–1.22 m); TL: 42 ft (13 m); AL: ≈6 ft (1.8 m); AD: 9 in (23 cm); skin + flesh: 2.25 in (5.7 cm) thick; EL: 52 ft (16 m)	Unknown; Verrill specimen No. 3 ("Coombs' Cove specimen")	Verrill (1874a:159); Verrill (1874b:167); Verrill (1875a:35); Verrill (1880a:183); Verrill (1882c:7)	Owen (1881:163); Frost (1934:101)	Specimen had a reddish colour. Verrill's data taken from newspaper accounts and 15/VI/1873 T.R. Bennett letter to Prof. Baird. Verrill (1880a:186) states his No. 6 is same specimen as No. 3; this cannot be correct, since capture date for No. 6 is clearly stated as December 1874 by Verrill (1875c:213).
25 (📷)	December 1872	Bonavista Bay, Newfoundland {NWA}	Found washed ashore	?Architeuthis dux;?Architeuthis harveyi	Entire (damaged arms)	Pair of jaws and two suckers		TL: 32 ft (9.8 m); AL: ≈10 ft (3.0 m); BL: ≈14 ft (4.3 m) [estimate]; BC: 6 ft (1.8 m)	NMNH; YPM catalog no. IZ 034835. Verrill specimen No. 4 ("Bonavista Bay specimen") (1875a:33); and possibly also Verrill specimen No. 11 ("Second Bonavista Bay specimen") (1875b:79)	Verrill (1874a:160); Verrill (1874b:167); Verrill (1875a:33, fig. 11); Verrill (1875b:79); Verrill (1880a:184, 187, pl. 16 figs. 5–6, pl. 25 fig. 5); Verrill (1882c:8, 11, pl. 3 figs. 4–4a, pl. 4 figs. 1–1a)	Pfeffer (1912:19); Frost (1934:101)	Material from Rev. A. Munn, through Prof. Baird to Verrill.
26 (📷)	Unknown (reported 1873)	North Atlantic Ocean {NWA}	From sperm whale stomach	Architeuthis princeps Verrill, 1875; Ommastrephes (Architeuthis) princeps	Upper and lower jaws	Upper and lower jaws		Beak measurements	Presented by Capt. N.E. Atwood of Provincetown, Massachusetts to EI; PASS; **syntype** of Architeuthis princeps Verrill, 1875b; Verrill specimen No. 10 ("Sperm-whale specimen")	Packard (1873:91, fig. 10); Verrill (1875a:22); Verrill (1875b:79, figs. 25–26); Tryon (1879b:185, pl. 85); Verrill (1880a:187, 210, pl. 18 figs. 1–2); Verrill (1882c:11, pl. 11 figs. 1–2)	Frost (1934:101)	First reported by Alpheus Spring Packard in February 1873. Verrill states Packard's illustration is inaccurate.
27 (📷)	Unknown (reported 1873)	Unknown; possibly east coast of South America {SWA}?	Not stated	Architeuthis monachus; Plectoteuthis grandis Owen, 1881; Architeuthis sp.? (grandis); nomen nudum	Sessile arm	Arm		AL: 9 ft (2.7 m); AC: 11 in (28 cm); ASD: ≤0.5 in (1.3 cm); total size and size of various missing parts estimated by Lee (1875:114)	BMNH; **holotype** of Plectoteuthis grandis Owen, 1881	Kent (1874a:179); Kent (1874d:493); Lee (1875:113); Verrill (1875b:86); Owen (1881:156, pls. 34–35); Verrill (1881b:400); Verrill (1882b:72); Steenstrup (1882:[160]); Pfeffer (1912:37)	Dell (1970:27)	"No history relating to it has been preserved", but first examined by Henry Lee in May 1873, having been in BMNH collections for "long" time. Bore c. 300 suckers.
28	1873	Yedo [Tokyo] fishmarket, Japan {NWP}	Purchased	Megateuthis martensii Hilgendorf, 1880; Nomen spurium	'Entire', missing head, "abdominal sac", ends of tentacles and arms	Not specified		ML: 186 cm; WL: 414 cm; HL: 41 cm; AL: 197 cm [longest]; ASD: 1.5 cm (with 37 cusps); EyD: 200 mm	ZMB Moll. 34716 + 38980; **holotype** of Megateuthis martensii Hilgendorf, 1880 [34716a: eyeball, 200 mm diameter, dry; 34716b: pieces of arm and gladius, suckers; 34716c: larger piece of arm with suckers; 38980: four suckers from holotype arm piece]	Hilgendorf (1880:67); Pfeffer (1912:31); Sasaki (1929:227); Glaubrecht & Salcedo-Vargas (2000:276)	Owen (1881:163); Sasaki (1916:90)	Second specimen from Tokyo fishmarket seen by Franz Martin Hilgendorf and used for description of gladius. Of other specimen, Hilgendorf saved "parts of an arm, the covering of the eye, and a fragment of the gladius" ("Theile eines Armes, die Hüllen des Auges, und ein Bruchstück des Schulpes"). Model of specimen placed in Exhibition of Fishery in Berlin.
29 (📷)	26 October 1873	off Portugal Cove, Conception Bay, Newfoundland {NWA}	Found floating at surface, alive	Megaloteuthis harveyi Kent, 1874; Architeuthis monachus of Steenstrup;?Architeuthis harveyi	Entire	One tentacle; one arm discarded		(see Verrill, 1880a:220) TL: 19 ft (5.8 m) [incomplete; total estimated at 35 ft (11 m) with ≈10 ft (3.0 m) left attached to body and 6 ft (1.8 m) subsequently destroyed]; TC: 3.5 in (8.9 cm) [stalk; club 6 in (15 cm)]; TSD: 1.25 in (3.2 cm); additional measurements based on photograph; additional club measurement from Harvey letter; BL: ≈10 ft (3.0 m); EL: ≈60 ft (18 m) [estimate]; AL: 6 ft (1.8 m); AD: 10 in (25 cm); TSC: ≈180; beak as large "as a six-gallon keg"; "tail" 10 ft (3.0 m) across	YPM?; **holotype** of Megaloteuthis harveyi Kent, 1874; Verrill specimen No. 2 ("Conception Bay specimen")	Harvey (1873a); Harvey (1873b); Harvey (1873c); Harvey (1874a:67, fig.); Murray (1874a:161); Murray (1874b:120); Verrill (1874a:159); Verrill (1874b:167); Kent (1874a:178, 182); Agassiz (1874:226); Kent (1874d:32); Buckland (1875:211); Verrill (1875a:34); Verrill (1875b:78); Verrill (1880a:181); Verrill (1881b:pl. 26 fig. 5); Verrill (1882b:74); Verrill (1882c:5, pl. 4 figs. 3–3a); Hatton & Harvey (1883:238); Harvey (1899:732, fig.); Ellis (1998a:81); Haslam (2017)	"13 December Field"; [Anon.] (1873:2); Harvey (1873d:2); [Anon.] (1874:333); de La Blanchère (1874:197, fig.); Rathbun (1881:266, fig.); Owen (1881:161, pl. 33 fig. 2); Lee (1883:42, fig. 9); [Anon.] (1902b:6, fig.); Pfeffer (1912:19); Frost (1934:100); Aldrich (1991:457); Packham (1998); Dery (2013)	Struck by Theophilus Picot from boat whereupon it "attacked" the boat; veracity of account has been questioned. (Note: In a 2013 article about the giant squid, Mark Dery wrote: "contemporary teuthologists dismiss the "attack" as the death throes of a moribund animal, pointing out that virtually all giant squid encountered on the ocean's surface are dead or dying. "There is not a single corroborated story of a [giant] squid attacking a man, a boat, or a submersible", asserts Ellis.") Severed tentacle purchased by Moses Harvey for NF$10 (equivalent to US$237 in 2025) and preserved in alcohol; exhibited at Alexander Murray's geological museum in St. John's (a forerunner of the Newfoundland Museum, itself now part of The Rooms), where it remained as of 1883. Famed naturalist Louis Agassiz showed great interest in the specimen, writing: "It is truly important for the history of cephalopods"; his final scientific letters (he died on 14 December 1873) concerned the possibility of examining its remains. Served as a reference for the earliest known "life-sized" giant squid cutout, from the 1870s. Considered by Paxton (2016a:83) as the "longest visually estimated" total length of any giant squid specimen. Encounter dramatised in episode of 1998 documentary series The X Creatures; fictionalised in The Adventures of Billy Topsail (1906) by Norman Duncan and The Kraken (1995) by Don C. Reed. (Note: As part of his research for The Kraken, Reed travelled to Newfoundland and spoke to Picot's descendants and to Margueritte Aldrich, widow of giant squid expert Frederick Aldrich.) A similar event is portrayed in The Shipping News (1993) by E. Annie Proulx.
30 (📷)	25 November? 1873	Logy Bay (≈3 miles from St. John's), Newfoundland {NWA}	In herring net	?Architeuthis monachus of Steenstrup; Ommastrephes (Architeuthis) monachus; Architeuthis harveyi (Kent, 1874)	Entire (badly mutilated, head severed, eyes missing, etc.)	Miscellaneous parts obtained from Rev. M. Harvey (gladius and ?)		(see Verrill, 1880a:220; Buckland, 1875:214) BL: ≈7 ft (2.1 m); BC: 5–6 ft (1.5–1.8 m); HC: 9 ft (2.7 m) [at junction with arms]; caudal fin: 22 in (56 cm) broad; TL: 24 ft (7.3 m); TC: 2.5 in (6.4 cm); TSD: 1.25 in (3.2 cm); AL: 6 ft (1.8 m) [all 8]; AC: 10 in (25 cm), 9 in (23 cm), 8 in (20 cm), 7 in (18 cm) [all basal measurements]; ASC: ≈100; CSC: ≈160; EyD: 4 in (10 cm) [estimate based on remains of "eyelid"]; club description; extensive description of reconstructed parts	YPM catalog nos. IZ 009634 (beak and limbs), IZ 017924 (radula), IZ 017925, IZ 017926 & IZ 034968. Verrill specimen No. 5 ("Logie Bay specimen")	Harvey (1873d:2); Verrill (1874a:160); Verrill (1874b:167); Kent (1874a:181); Kent (1874d:32); Buckland (1875:212, 214); Verrill (1875a:22, figs. 1–6, 10); Verrill (1876:236); Tryon (1879b:184, pls. 83–84); Verrill (1880a:184, 197, pls. 13–15, pl. 16 figs. 1–4, pl. 16a); Verrill (1880b:295, pl. 13); Verrill (1882c:8, pls. 1–2, pl. 3 figs. 1–3, pl. 4 figs. 4–11, pl. 5 figs. 1–5); Hatton & Harvey (1883:240); Harvey (1899:735, fig.); Pfeffer (1912:18); Aldrich (1991:457, fig. 1A, B); Haslam (2017)	Harvey in Morning Chronicle (newspaper) of St. John's; Maritime Monthly Magazine of St. John's, March 1874; several other newspapers; [Anon.] (1874:332); Lee (1883:43, fig. 10); [Anon.] (1902b:6, fig.); Frost (1934:101)	Verrill's data from letter to Dr. Dawson from Moses Harvey. Harvey purchased specimen for NF$10 (equivalent to US$237 in 2025). Photographs made of a) entire body, somewhat mutilated anteriorly; b) head and 10 limbs. Poorly preserved; first in brine, then in alcohol. Capture date given as December several times, then as November several times, and as 25 November by Aldrich (1991:457). Served as a reference for the earliest known "life-sized" giant squid cutout, from the 1870s. Verrill's description served as the basis for the "life-sized" model that now hangs at the Peabody Museum of Natural History (YPM IZ 104471), built in 1966, though it was also based on several Newfoundland specimens from the 1960s. Specimen and famous photograph of it draped over Harvey's shower curtain rod were subject of Preparing the Ghost (2014), a work of creative nonfiction by Matthew Gavin Frank.
31	1874	Buøy, Foldenfjord, Norway {NEA}	Found washed ashore	Architeuthis dux	Entire	None		WL: ≈4 m		Grieg (1933:19)	Nordgård (1928:71)	
32	10 May 1874	off Trincomalee, Sri Lanka (8°50′N 84°05′E) {NIO}	Reportedly seen sinking ship					Unknown		The Times, 4 July 1874; Mystic Press, 31 July 1874; Lane (1957:205); Flynn & Weigall (1980); Ellis (1998a:198); Boyle (1999); Uragoda (2005:97)	Welfare & Fairley (1980:74); Aldrich (1990a:5); Clarke (1992:72); Ellis (1998a:258)	Schooner Pearl (150 tons) with crew of six, including captain James Floyd, supposedly sunk by giant squid. Incident reportedly seen from passenger steamer Strathowen, bound from Colombo to Madras, which rescued five of the crew. Veracity of account has been questioned, though taken seriously by Frederick Aldrich. Fictionalised in Don C. Reed's 1995 novel The Kraken.
33 (📷)	2 November 1874	on beach, St. Paul Island, Indian Ocean (38°43′S 77°32′E) {SIO}	Found washed ashore	Architeuthis mouchezi Vélain (1875:1002) [nomen nudum]; Mouchezis sancti-pauli Vélain (1877:81); Ommastrephes mouchezi	Entire; found in advanced state of decay	Tentacle(s?) and buccal mass		EL: 7.15 m	MNHN catalog nos. 3-2-658 & 3-2-659 (tentacular clubs); **holotype** of Mouchezis sancti-pauli Vélain, 1877	Vélain (1875:1002); Vélain (1877:81 & 83, fig. 8); Vélain (1878:81 & 83, fig. 8); Tryon (1879b:184, pl. 82 fig. 378); Owen (1881:159); Pfeffer (1912:32)	Gervais (1875:88); Verrill (1875c:213); Wright (1878:329)	Recorded by geologist Charles Vélain during French astronomical mission to Île Saint-Paul to observe the transit of Venus. Specimen was photographed.
34 (📷)	December 1874	Grand Bank, Fortune Bay, Newfoundland {NWA}	Found washed ashore	Architeuthis princeps	Entire, except for tail (cut up for dog food)	Jaws, one tentacular sucker		EL: 42–43 ft (12.8–13.1 m); HL+BL: 12–13 ft (3.7–4.0 m); ?TL: 30 ft (9.1 m); TL: 26 ft (7.9 m); TC: 16 in (41 cm); BL: 10 ft (3.0 m); jaws	YPM catalog nos. IZ 010272 (beak) & IZ 034836. Verrill specimen No. 6 and Verrill specimen No. 13 ("Fortune Bay specimen")	Verrill (1875a:35); Verrill (1875c:213); Verrill (1880a:186, 188, 217, pl. 17 fig. 11); Verrill (1881b:445, pl. 54 fig. 1); Verrill (1882c:10, 12, pl. 7 fig. 1, pl. 9 fig. 11)	Simms letter 27/X/1875 to Verrill; Frost (1934:102)	Data from 10/XII/1873 letter from Mr. Harvey to unknown individual citing measurements taken by G. Simms; Pfeffer (1912:21). Measurements are given differently in different papers. Verrill (1880a:186) and Verrill (1882c:10) states his No. 6 is same specimen as No. 3; this cannot be correct, as capture date for No. 6 is clearly stated as December 1874 by Verrill (1875c:213). Verrill (1880a:188, pl. 17) repeats record as his No. 13.
35	winter of 1874–1875	near Harbor Grace, Newfoundland {NWA}	Found washed ashore			Destroyed		None taken	None; Verrill specimen No. 12 ("Harbor Grace specimen")	Verrill (1875b:79); Verrill (1880a:188); Verrill (1882c:12)	Frost (1934:102)	"destroyed before its value became known, and no measurements are given"
36	Unknown (reported 1875)	west St. Modent (on Labrador side), Strait of Belle Isle, Newfoundland {NWA}	Found alive	Architeuthis princeps or Architeuthis monachus of Steenstrup	Entire	None; cut up, salted, and barrelled for dog meat		?TL: 37 ft (11 m); BL+HL: 15 ft (4.6 m); EL: 52 ft (16 m); SD: ≈2 in (5.1 cm)	None; Verrill specimen No. 7 ("Labrador specimen")	Verrill (1875a:36); Verrill (1880a:186); Verrill (1882c:10)	Dr. Honeyman article in Halifax newspaper; Frost (1934:101)	Data from unidentified third party cited in Halifax newspaper article.
37 (📷)	25 April 1875 (or 26 April)	north-west of Boffin Island, Connemara, Ireland {NEA}	Found immobile at surface; attacked and chased by fishermen; arms successively hacked off and eventually killed	Architeuthis monachus; Architeuthis dux Steenstrup, 1857	Entire	Beak and buccal mass, one arm ("much mutilated and decayed", missing horny rings), portions of both tentacles ("shrunk and distorted", missing horny rings on large central club suckers); head, eyes and second arm initially saved, but soon lost/destroyed		TL: 30 ft (9.1 m) [fresh]; TL: 14/17 ft (4.3/5.2 m) [pickled]; CL: 2 ft 9 in (0.84 m) [shrunken]; CSD: nearly 1 in (2.5 cm); SSD: 3/20 in (0.38 cm); AL: 8 ft (2.4 m) [fresh]; AC: 15 in (38 cm) [fresh]; beak: ≈5 1/4 in (13 cm) × 3 1/2 in (8.9 cm); "trunk": "fully as long as the canoe"; EyD: ≈15 in (38 cm); WT: ≈6 st (38 kg) [head only]; additional sucker measurements	NMI catalog no. 1995.16 (beak in spirit)	O'Connor (1875:4502); More (1875b:4569); More (1875c:123); Verrill (1875c:214); Massy (1909:30); Nunn & Holmes (2008)	Galway Express 1875; Ritchie (1918:137); Massy (1928:32); Taylor (1932:3); Robson (1933:692); Rees (1950:40); Hardy (1956:285); Collins (1998:489)	**On public display.** Caught by three-man longline fishing crew of currach ("curragh") for use as bait for coarse fish. Found motionless at surface surrounded by gulls, becoming active upon being attacked by fishermen, swimming away "at a tremendous rate" and releasing ink. Progressively disabled with a knife (fishermen having no gaff or spare rope) as chased for 2 hours over 5 miles (8.0 km), before head eventually severed; heavy mantle allowed to sink. Specimen secured and preserved by Sergeant Thomas O'Connor of the Royal Irish Constabulary and forwarded by him to the museum of the Royal Dublin Society, Dublin (now the National Museum of Ireland – Natural History).
38	October 1875	Grand Banks [of Newfoundland], Atlantic Ocean (chiefly 44°–44°30'N 49°30'–49°50'W) {NWA}	Found floating at surface; "mostly entirely dead" but small minority "not quite dead, but entirely disabled"	Architeuthis	Multiple; mutilated by birds and fishes to varying degrees, especially limbs; No. 25 missing parts of arms; No. 26 with intact arms and tentacles	None; cut up for cod bait		No. 25: Filled ≈75 US gal (280 L) tub; WT: nearly 1,000 lb (450 kg) [estimate, complete]; No. 26: TL: 36 ft (11 m); Howard specimens: BL+HL?: mostly 10–15 ft (3.0–4.6 m) [excluding "arms"]; BD: ≈18 in (46 cm) [average]; AL: usually 3–4 ft (0.91–1.22 m) [incomplete]; AD: "about as large as a man's thigh" [at base]; Tragabigzanda specimens: BL+HL?: 8–12 ft (2.4–3.7 m) [excluding "arms"]	None; included Verrill specimen No. 25 and Verrill specimen No. 26	Verrill (1881a:251); Verrill (1881b:396); Verrill (1882c:19)	Frost (1934:103)	An unusual number (≈25–30) of mostly dead giant squid found by Gloucester, Massachusetts fishermen, with similar number estimated to have been obtained by vessels from other areas. Data from Capt. J.W. Collins of the United States Fish Commission, who at the time of the incident commanded schooner Howard, which collected five specimens. Other involved vessels included schooner Sarah P. Ayer (Capt. Oakley), which took 1–2 specimens; E. R. Nickerson (Capt. McDonald), which harpooned one (No. 26) with intact arms that was "not entirely dead"; and schooner Tragabigzanda (Capt. Mallory), which took three in one afternoon. Some fishermen stated that such "big squids" were also common at the Flemish Cap during the same season. Verrill conjectured that this mass mortality might have been due to an outbreak of disease or parasites, and/or related to their reproductive cycle.
39	c. 1876	Clifford Bay, Cape Campbell, New Zealand {SWP}	Found washed ashore		Entire	Jaws		BL: 7 ft (2.1 m) [estimate]; EL: ≈20 ft (6.1 m) [estimate]	Colonial Museum [NMNZ]	Robson (1887:156); Kirk (1880)	Pfeffer (1912:32); Dell (1952:98)	
40	20 November 1876	Hammer Cove, southwest arm of Green Bay, Notre Dame Bay, Newfoundland {NWA}	Found washed ashore		Partial specimen; devoured by foxes and seabirds	Piece of pen 16 in (41 cm) long		WH: 18 in (46 cm); FW: 18 in (46 cm)	In Harvey's possession; Verrill specimen No. 15 ("Hammer Cove specimen")	Verrill (1880a:190); Verrill (1880b:284); Verrill (1882c:14)	M. Harvey letter 25 August 1877 to Verrill; Frost (1934:102)	
41	1877?	Norway {NEA}	Not stated		Map location only					Sivertsen (1955:11, fig. 4)		
42 (📷)	24 September 1877	Catalina, Trinity Bay, Newfoundland {NWA}	Found washed ashore, alive	Architeuthis princeps; Ommastrephes (Architeuthis) princeps	Entire; "nearly perfect specimen"	Loose suckers		(see Verrill, 1880a:220) HL+BL: 9.5 ft (2.9 m); BC: 7 ft (2.1 m); TL: 30 ft (9.1 m); AL: 11 ft (3.4 m) [longest, ventral]; AC: 17 in (43 cm) [ventral]; beak; FW: 2 ft 9 in (0.84 m)	YPM catalog nos. IZ 017927, IZ 017928, IZ 017929 & IZ 017930. Verrill specimen No. 14 ("Catalina specimen")	Harvey (1877); [Anon.] (1877a:266, 269, fig.); [Anon.] (1877b:867, fig.); [Anon.] (1877c:305, fig.); Verrill (1877:425); Tryon (1879b:185); Verrill (1880a:189, pl. 17 figs. 1–10, pls. 19–20); Verrill (1880b:295, pl. 12); Verrill (1882c:13, pl. 8, pl. 9 figs. 1–10, pl. 10)	Owen (1881:163); Hatton & Harvey (1883:242); Pfeffer (1912:21); Frost (1934:102); Miner (1935:187, fig., 201); Ellis (1997a:31)	Measured fresh by M. Harvey; examined preserved (poorly) by Verrill at New York Aquarium. Later "prepared" for exhibition by taxidermist. Served as the basis for the earliest "life-sized" giant squid models, including the original three made by Verrill and J. H. Emerton and six subsequent ones by Ward's. Described by Frederick Aldrich as "largest giant squid to be encountered in Newfoundland".
43	October 1877	Trinity Bay, Newfoundland {NWA}	Not stated		"big squid"	None		None taken	None; Verrill specimen No. 17 ("Trinity Bay specimen")	Verrill (1880a:191); Verrill (1880b:285); Verrill (1882c:15)	M. Harvey letter 17 November 1877 to Verrill citing reference to specimen by John Duffet; Frost (1934:102)	Specimen cut up and used for manure.
44 (📷)	21 November 1877	Smith's Sound, Lance Cove, Trinity Bay, Newfoundland {NWA}	Found washed ashore, alive	?Architeuthis princeps	Entire	None; carried off by tide		BL(+HL?): 11 ft (3.4 m); TL: 33 ft (10 m); AL: 13 ft (4.0 m) [estimate]	None; Verrill specimen No. 16 ("Lance Cove specimen")	Verrill (1880a:190); Verrill (1880b:285); Verrill (1882c:14)	M. Harvey letter 27 November 1877 to Verrill citing measurements taken by John Duffet; Frost (1934:102)	Found still alive, having "ploughed up a trench or furrow about 30 feet [9.1 m] long and of considerable depth by the stream of water that it ejected with great force from its siphon. When the tide receded it died."
(📷)	1878 (accessioned)	Catlins, New Zealand {SWP}	Not stated	Architeuthis sp.	Entire?	Beak		BL: 7 ft (2.1 m); ML: 1.6 m [estimate]; EL: ≈10 m [estimate]	Otago Museum catalog no. IV119151	Lau (2021); [OM] (2021)	Copedo (2022)	**On public display.** Collected by Capt. Charles Hayward (Catlins River harbourmaster, 1872–1887). Acquired in 1878 by Capt. Frederick Wollaston Hutton, first curator of Otago Museum, according to museum records; rediscovered and publicised in 2021. Placed on display in Animal Attic gallery. Mantle and total length estimated by teuthologist Kat Bolstad based on beak measurements.
45 (📷)	2 November 1878	Thimble Tickle, near Little Bay Copper Mine, Notre Dame Bay, Newfoundland {NWA}	Found aground offshore, alive; secured to tree with grapnel and rope; died as tide receded	?Architeuthis princeps	Entire	None; cut up for dog food		BL+HL: 20 ft (6.1 m); TL: 35 ft (11 m) (Note: The length of the "body [..] from the beak to the extremity of the tail" (i.e. mantle plus head) was said to be 20 ft (6.1 m), with "one of the arms" (presumably a tentacle) measuring 35 ft (10.7 m), for a total length of 55 ft (16.8 m). The total length of the "Thimble Tickle specimen" is sometimes mistakenly cited as 57 ft (17.4 m). Over time, various other superlative measurements have been attributed to the specimen, including a mass of 2 tonnes or exactly 4,480 lb (2,030 kg); an eye diameter of 40 cm, 18 in (46 cm), or 9 in (23 cm); and suckers 4 in (10 cm) across. Wildly excessive mass estimates for the specimen have included: 29.25 or 30 short tons (26.5 or 27.2 tonnes); near 24 tonnes; less than 8 tonnes; and 2.8 or "more realistic[ally]" 2 tonnes.)	None; Verrill specimen No. 18 ("Thimble Tickle specimen")	Verrill (1880a:191); Verrill (1880b:285); Verrill (1882c:15); Ellis (1998a:6, 89, 107)	M. Harvey letter 30 January 1879 to Boston Traveller; Hatton & Harvey (1883:242); Holder (1885:165, pl. 25); Frost (1934:102); Carberry (2001); Harvey (2004); Hickey (2009); Paxton (2016a:83)	Discovered by fisherman Stephen Sherring and two others. (Note: The identity of the two other fishermen in the boat is not given in Moses Harvey's original account, but later sources identify Joseph Martin, the founder of Thimble Tickle (now known as Glovers Harbour), as one of the fishermen involved in the squid's capture. George Marsh and Henry Rowsell—the founders of the nearby settlements of Winter House Cove and Lock's Harbour (Lockesporte), respectively—have also been suggested as participants. The fishermen may have learned of Moses Harvey's interest in the giant squid when the latter visited Notre Dame Bay only a couple of months earlier, in August 1878, as part of a geological survey. A CBC News report broadcast in 2004 features Maurice Martin, great-great-grandson of Joseph Martin, recounting the story of the squid's capture as told to him by his grandfather.) Often cited as the largest recorded giant squid specimen, and long treated as such by Guinness. (Note: An early example comes from the 1968 edition of the Guinness Book of World Records, which gives an erroneous provenance of "Thimble Tickle, one of the Thimble Islands off the coast of Connecticut [sic]"; this was corrected by the 1971 edition. The "Thimble Tickle specimen" is also cited as the largest recorded giant squid in many subsequent Guinness publications. The specimen is not mentioned in the first US edition (titled The Guinness Book of Superlatives), published in 1956, which gives more modest maximum dimensions for the species: "The giant squid (Architeuthis) found on the Newfoundland Banks may have a body length of 8 feet [2.4 m] and measure up to 40 feet [12 m] overall.") Considered by Paxton (2016a:83) as candidate for "longest measured" total length of any giant squid specimen (together with #62, and less reliably #209). Giant Squid Interpretation Centre and "life-sized", 55-foot sculpture built near site of capture; sculpture appeared on Canadian postage stamp issued in 2011 and has associated annual festival.
46	2 December 1878	Three Arms, South Arm of Notre Dame Bay, Newfoundland {NWA}	Found washed ashore	?Architeuthis princeps	Entire, mutilated and with arms missing (only one arm "perfect")	None; cut up for dog food		BL+HL: 15 ft (4.6 m); BC: 12 ft (3.7 m); AL: 16 ft (4.9 m); AD: "thicker than a man's thigh"	None; Verrill specimen No. 19 ("Three Arms specimen")	Verrill (1880a:192); Verrill (1880b:286); Verrill (1882c:16)	M. Harvey letter 30 January 1879 to Boston Traveller; Hatton & Harvey (1883:242); Frost (1934:102); Paxton (2016a:83)	Found dead by fisherman William Budgell after heavy gale. Considered by Paxton (2016a:83) as the "longest measured" standard length of any giant squid specimen.
47 (📷)	23 May 1879	Lyall Bay, Cook Strait, New Zealand {SWP}	Found washed ashore	Steenstrupia stockii Kirk, 1882 [=Architeuthis sp.?]	Entire, but somewhat mutilated; missing ends of tentacles	Pen, beak, tongue, some suckers		ML: 9 ft 2 in (2.79 m); BC: 7 ft 3 in (2.21 m); HL: 1 ft 11 in (0.58 m); BL+HL: 11 ft 1 in (3.38 m); HC: 4 ft (1.2 m); AL: 4 ft 3 in (1.30 m); AC: 11 in (28 cm); ASC: 36; TL: 6 ft 2 in (1.88 m) [incomplete]; FL: 24 in (61 cm); FW: 13 in (33 cm) (single); GL: 6 ft 3 in (1.91 m); GW: 11 in (28 cm); other measurements	NMNZ catalog nos. M.125403 & M.125405; **holotype** of Steenstrupia stockii Kirk, 1882. Kirk specimen No. 3	Kirk (1880:310); Verrill (1881b:398); Kirk (1882:286, pl. 36 figs. 2–4)	Verrill (1882d:477); Kirk (1888:34); Pfeffer (1912:34); Suter (1913:1051); Dell (1952:98); Dell (1970:27); Stevens (1980:213, fig. 12.24); Stevens (1988:149, fig. 2); Judd (1996); Paxton (2016a:83); Greshko (2016)	Measurements taken by T.W. Kirk. Has been called the "largest specimen recorded in the scientific literature" based on erroneous total length of "approximately 20 m", itself based on claim by Roper & Boss (1982:104) relating to unspecified specimen "stranded on a beach in New Zealand in 1880 [sic]". Considered by Paxton (2016a:83) as the longest reliably measured mantle length of any giant squid specimen (less reliably that of #104), but measurement considered dubious by experts due to wide discrepancy with reported gladius length. (Note: Paxton countered that this was possibly attributable to shrinkage of the gladius prior to measurement, or to it having been severed in several places beforehand, but Kirk wrote that it was measured "when first extracted" and only later "shr[a]nk considerably".)
48	1879	off Nova Scotia, Canada (42°49′N 62°57′W) {NWA}	From fish stomach, Alepidosaurus [sic] ferox	?Architeuthis megaptera Verrill, 1878; ?Architeuthis harveyi (Kent, 1874)	Terminal part of tentacular arm	Portion of arm		18 in (46 cm) long	NMNH catalog no. 576962. Verrill specimen No. 20 ("Banquereau specimen" [after Banquereau Bank, a bank off Nova Scotia])	Verrill (1880a:193); Verrill (1880b:287); Verrill (1882c:16)	Frost (1934:103)	Lancetfish taken by Capt. J.W. Collins of schooner Marion on halibut trawl-line.
49 (📷)	September 1879	Olafsfjord, Iceland {NEA}		Architeuthis		Left tentacle		TL: 7680+ mm; CL: 1010 mm; CSC: 268; TSC: 290; additional indices and counts	ZMUC [specimen NA-7 of Roeleveld (2002)]	Roeleveld (2002:727)		Tentacle morphology examined by Roeleveld (2002).
50	October 1879	near Brigus, Conception Bay, Newfoundland {NWA}	Found washed ashore		Two arms with other mutilated parts	Undetermined		AL: 8 ft (2.4 m)	None?; Verrill specimen No. 22 ("Brigus specimen")	Verrill (1880a:194); Verrill (1880b:287); Verrill (1882c:17)	Frost (1934:103)	Found after storm. Information provided by Moses Harvey.
51	1 November 1879	James's Cove, Bonavista Bay, Newfoundland {NWA}	Found at surface, alive		Entire	None; cut up by fishermen		EL: 38 ft (12 m); BL: 9 ft (2.7 m); BC: ≈6 ft (1.8 m); TL: 29 ft (8.8 m)	None; Verrill specimen No. 23 ("James's Cove specimen")	Verrill (1880a:194); Verrill (1880b:287); Verrill (1882c:17)	Morning Chronicle of St. John's 9 December 1879; Frost (1934:103)	Found alive and driven ashore.
52	Unknown (reported 1880)	near Boulder Bank, Nelson, New Zealand {SWP}	Not stated; hook and line?		Not indicated	Undetermined		8 ft (2.4 m) long	None?; Kirk specimen No. 4	Kirk (1880:310); Verrill (1881b:398)	Newspaper article	Caught by fishing party. No other data.
53	Unknown (reported 1880)	near Flat Point, east coast, New Zealand {SWP}	Not stated		Not indicated	Undetermined		None	None?; Kirk specimen No. 5	Kirk (1880:310); Verrill (1881b:398)	Description sent to Mr. Beetham, M.H.R., by Mr. Moore	Found by Mr. Moore. No other data.
54 (📷)	April 1880	Grand Banks, Newfoundland {NWA}	Found dead at surface	Architeuthis harveyi (Kent, 1874)	Head, tentacles, and arms only	Head, tentacles, and arms		TL: 66 in (170 cm); ASC: 330; extensive measurements and counts	YPM catalog no. 12600y. Verrill specimen No. 24 ("Grand Banks specimen" [2nd])	Verrill (1881b:259, pl. 26 figs. 1–4, pl. 38 figs. 3–7); Verrill (1882c:18, pl. 4 figs. 2–2a, pl. 5 figs. 6–8, pl. 6)	Pfeffer (1912:19); Frost (1934:103)	Found dead by Capt. O.A. Whitten of schooner Wm.H. Oakes. Arm and sucker regeneration documented by Verrill (1881b:260); one of two published records of limb regeneration in architeuthids (as identified by Imperadore & Fiorito, 2018), the other being a case of tentacle regeneration in #169 (see also #549).
55 (📷)	6 June 1880	Island Bay, Cook Strait, New Zealand {SWP}	Found washed ashore	Architeuthis verrilli Kirk, 1882	Entire	Not specified		ML: 7 ft 6 in (2.29 m); BC: 9 ft 2 in (2.79 m); TL: 25 ft (7.6 m); AL(I, II, IV): 9 ft (2.7 m); AC(I, II, IV): 15 in (38 cm); AL(III): 10 ft 5 in (3.18 m); AC(III): 21 in (53 cm); ASC(III): 71; HC: 4 ft 3 in (1.30 m); HL: 19 in (48 cm); FL: 30 in (76 cm); FW: 28 in (71 cm); EyD: 5 in (13 cm) by 4 in (10 cm)	NMNZ; **holotype** of Architeuthis verrilli Kirk, 1882; specimen no longer extant	Kirk (1882:284, pl. 36 fig. 1)	Verrill (1882d:477); Kirk (1888:35); Pfeffer (1912:33); Suter (1913:1052); Dell (1952:98); Dell (1970:27)	Measurements taken by Kirk, except TL by James McColl. Beak and portions of gladius ("skeleton") taken by Italian fishermen and not recovered.
56	c. 1880	Kvænangen fjord, Norway {NEA}	Found washed ashore	Architeuthis dux Steenstrup, 1857	Entire	None		None		Grieg (1933:19)	Sivertsen (1955:11)	
57	c. 1880	Tønsvik, Tromsøysundet, Norway {NEA}	Found washed ashore	Architeuthis dux Steenstrup, 1857	Entire	None		None		Grieg (1933:19)		
58	October 1880	Kilkee, County Clare, Ireland {NEA}	Found washed ashore	"octopus"; Architeuthis sp.						O'Brien (1880:585); Ritchie (1918:137)	Rees (1950:40); Collins (1998:489)	Originally cited as an octopus.
59	first week of November 1881	on beach, Hennesey's Cove, Long Island, Placentia Bay, Newfoundland {NWA}	Found washed ashore	Architeuthis princeps?	Entire; "much mutilated by crows and other birds"	Not stated		"very large"; BL+HL: 26 ft (7.9 m) [estimate]	Verrill specimen No. 28	Verrill (1882c:221)	M. Harvey letter 19 December 1881 to Verrill	Found by Albert Butcher and George Wareham, "who cut a portion from the head", at uninhabited locality; Verrill considered their estimate of the specimen's length "probably too large". Moses Harvey learned of the specimen from C. D. Chambers, magistrate of Harbour Buffet, Placentia Bay. Only mentioned in Verrill (1882c:221); overlooked by Ellis (1994a:379–384), Ellis (1998a:257–265), and Sweeney & Roper (2001).
60 (📷)	10 November 1881	Portugal Cove, near St. John's, Newfoundland {NWA}	Found floating dead near shore	Architeuthis harveyi (Kent, 1874)	Entire	Entire (somewhat mutilated and poorly preserved)		a) BL: 5.5 ft (1.7 m); HL: 1.25 ft (0.38 m); EL: 28 ft (8.5 m); BC: 4.5 ft (1.4 m) b) ML: 4.16 ft (1.27 m); BC: 4 ft (1.2 m); FL: 1.75 ft (0.53 m); FW: 8 in (20 cm) [single]; TL: 15 ft (4.6 m); CL: 2 ft (0.61 m); AL: 4.66 ft (1.42 m) [ventral, minus tip]; TC: 8.5 in (22 cm) [at base]; additional measurements	E.M. Worth Museum (101 Bowery, NY, NY). Verrill specimen No. 27	[Anon.] (1881:821, fig.); Verrill (1881b:422); Verrill (1882a:71); Verrill (1882c:201, 219)	Morris article in 25 November 1881 New York Herald; Hatton & Harvey (1883:242); Pfeffer (1912:19); Ellis (1997a:34)	Obtained by Mr. Morris, photographed by E. Lyons (St. John's), shipped on ice by steamer Catima to New York, purchased and preserved by E.M. Worth. Measurements by a) Inspector Murphy (chief Board of Public Works) when iced; b) Verrill of fixed specimen. An 1881 specimen from Portugal Cove with a "body" reportedly 11 ft (3.4 m) long, mentioned in The Evening Telegram of St. John's (21 December 1933) and cited by Frost (1934:103), presumably refers to the same animal. May have served as a reference for Verrill and J. H. Emerton's original three "life-sized" giant squid models (and six subsequent ones by Ward's), as Verrill saw the specimen shortly before he began modelling.
61	30 June 1886	Cape Campbell, New Zealand {SWP}	Found washed ashore	Architeuthis kirkii Robson, 1887	Entire	Beak and club		ML: 8 ft 3 in (2.51 m); HL: 1 ft 9 in (0.53 m); AL: 6 ft 6 in (1.98 m); TL: 18 ft 10 in (5.74 m); EL: 28 ft 10 in (8.79 m); BC: ≈8 ft (2.4 m) [estimate]	NMNZ catalog nos. M.125404 & ?M.125406; **holotype** of Architeuthis kirkii Robson, 1887. Kirk specimen No. 2	Kirk (1879:310); Verrill (1881b:398); Robson (1887:156)	C.H.[W.] Robson letter 19 June 1879 to T.W. Kirk; Pfeffer (1912:35); Suter (1913:1048); Dell (1952:98); Dell (1970:27)	Found by Mr. C.H.[W.] Robson; beak given to Mr. A. Hamilton.
	1886	Cupids and Hearts Content (one specimen from each), Newfoundland {NWA}	Found washed ashore	"giant squid"	Two specimens; entire?	None?; cut up for bait		None given		Earle (1977:53)		Moses Harvey only learned of specimens after their destruction. Information sourced from clippings found in one of Harvey's scrapbooks preserved at Newfoundland Public Archives (PG/A/17).
62 (📷)	"early" October 1887	Lyall Bay, New Zealand {SWP}	Found washed ashore	Architeuthis longimanus Kirk, 1888	Entire	Beak and buccal-mass	Female	EL: 55 ft 2 in (16.81 m); ML: 71 in (180 cm); BC: 63 in (160 cm); extensive additional measurements and description (Note: Kirk (1888:38) provides a table with a detailed breakdown of the specimen's various measurements. There is, however, a discrepancy between the total length of 684 in (17.37 m, or exactly 57 ft) given in the table—which agrees with the individual values of 71 in (1.80 m) for the mantle, 22 in (0.56 m) for the head, and 591 in (15.01 m) for the tentacles—and the total length of 55 ft 2 in (16.81 m) given by Kirk in the body of the article. Wood (1982:191) suggested that, due to the tentacles' highly retractile nature, the total length of 62 feet (18.9 m) originally reported by the fisherman "may have been correct at the time he found the squid", and that "[t]his probably also explains the discrepancy in Kirk's figures". Owing to its small mantle size, Wood (1982:191) estimated that "this specimen probably weighed less than 300 lb [140 kg]". O'Shea & Bolstad (2008) opined that the reported total length of 55 ft 2 in (16.81 m) "simply cannot be correct" and attributed it to either "imagination" or artificial lengthening of the tentacles. They added that a female giant squid with a mantle length of 71 in (180 cm) "measured post mortem and relaxed (by modern standards) today would have a total length of ≈32 feet [9.8 m]". Paxton (2016a:86) wrote that this specimen "clearly has the largest ratio of TL to ML [total length to mantle length] ever known in Architeuthis [...] which led [O'Shea & Bolstad, 2008] to suggest that the length was paced out and/or there was extensive post-mortem stretching. However, a re-reading of the original paper suggests that the specimen, although initially paced out, was actually measured, nevertheless the TL is at the edge of the 99.9% prediction interval range [...] and so it was certainly an unusual specimen.")	Dominion Museum [NMNZ]; **holotype** of Architeuthis longimanus Kirk, 1888. Specimen not found	Kirk (1888:35, pls. 7–9); Pfeffer (1912:36)	Suter (1913:1049); Dell (1952:98); Dell (1970:27); Wood (1982:191); Ellis (1998a:7, 92); O'Shea & Bolstad (2008); Dery (2013); Paxton (2016a:83)	Strangely proportioned animal that has been much commented on; sometimes cited as the longest giant squid specimen ever recorded. Considered by Paxton (2016a:83) as candidate for "longest measured" total length of any giant squid specimen (together with #45, and less reliably #209). Found by Mr. Smith, local fisherman. Measurements taken by T.W. Kirk. Date found listed incorrectly in Dell (1952:98).
63	27 August 1888	between Pico and St. George, Azores Islands (38°33′57″N 30°39′30″W) at 1266 m depth {NEA}	By benthic trawl	Architeuthis? sp.?	Large beak	Undetermined		None		Joubin (1895:34)		
64	September 1889	Løkberg farm, Mo i Rana, Norway {NEA}	Found washed ashore		Entire	None		BL: ≈5 ells (3.1 m); TL: 10–12 ells (6.3–7.5 m)		[Anon.] (1890:190)	Sivertsen (1955:11, fig. 4)	Bergen Museum notified of find by Lorentz Pettersen of Sjona, Helgeland. Failure to secure remains prompted museum to issue notice in June 1890 issue of Naturen seeking specimens in future (which would be first for a Norwegian museum) and offering to cover all associated transportation and packing costs in addition to regular compensation.
	1890	Island Cove, Newfoundland {NWA}	Found washed ashore	"giant squid"	Entire?	None?; cut up for bait?		None given		Earle (1977:53)		Moses Harvey only learned of specimen after its destruction. Information sourced from clippings found in one of Harvey's scrapbooks preserved at Newfoundland Public Archives (PG/A/17).
65	Unknown (reported 1892)	Sao Miguel Island, Azores Islands {NEA}	Found washed ashore	Architeuthis princeps	Entire?	Jaws and tentacle club		Beak measurements	Museum in Lisbon	Girard (1892:214, pls. 1–2)	Pfeffer (1912:27); Robson (1933:692)	
66	1892	Greenland {NWA}	Not stated	Architeuthis monachus						Posselt (1898:279)		
[2]	Unknown (reported November 1894)	Talcahuano, Chile {SEP}	Unknown; collected and donated to ZMB by Ludwig Plate	Ommastrephes gigas; Architeuthis; Dosidicus gigas	Entire	Entire, internal parts missing, preserved in alcohol; "exceptionally good condition" (Glaubrecht & Salcedo-Vargas, 2004:55)	Female (adult)	ML: 865 mm; MW: 230 mm; EL: 1740 mm; HL: 160 mm; HW: 190 mm; FL: 440 mm; FW: 600 mm; TL: 720 mm; CL: 225 mm; AL(I): 460 mm; AL(II): 450 mm; AL(III): 500 mm; AL(IV): 440 mm; LSD: 20 mm [tentacle]; LSD: 15 mm [arm II]; LSD: 14 mm [arm II]; EyD: 80 mm; Lens: 35 mm	ZMB Moll. 49.804	Martens (1894); Glaubrecht & Salcedo-Vargas (2004:53, figs. 1a–f, 2a–g)	Möbius (1898a:373); Möbius (1898b:135); [Anon.] (1899:38); [Anon.] (1902a:41); Kilias (1967:491, fig.); Wechsler (1999)	**Non-architeuthid.** **On public display.** First noted by Carl Eduard von Martens in November 1894. Exhibited at Museum für Naturkunde in Berlin from 1897 to World War II, and again from c. 1945–50, when it was housed in main entrance hall in large glass cylinder on marble pedestal. more From December 1975, displayed as part of "Meeresungeheuer" exhibit at German Maritime Museum in Stralsund, on loan from ZMB. Return to museum noted in February 1992, when it was placed in new purpose-built container and displayed in Malacological Collection. Incorrectly identified by Kilias (1967:491) as Architeuthis in figure legend, with total length given as ≈2 m (illustration removed in later edition). Specimen cast in 1997–98 for creation of 8.5-m-long plastic "giant squid" model, exhibited since 1998 at Übersee-Museum Bremen with sperm whale skull. Re-identified as Dosidicus gigas in June 1998 by Mario Alejandro Salcedo-Vargas. Internal parts apparently removed when specimen originally dissected by Martens or prepared for exhibition (1894–97).
67 (📷)	4 February 1895	Bay of Tateyama [Tokyo Bay], Province of Awa, Japan {NWP}	In net	Architeuthis japonica Pfeffer, 1912	Entire	Undetermined	Female	ML: 720 mm; MW: 235 mm; GL: 640 mm; FL: 280 mm; FW: 200 mm; TL: 2910 mm; extensive additional measurements and description	Undetermined; ?Zoological Institute, Science College, Tokyo; **holotype** of Architeuthis japonica Pfeffer, 1912	Mitsukuri & Ikeda (1895:39, pl. 10); Pfeffer (1912:27)	Sasaki (1916:89)	Caught in net after 2–3-day storm.
68 (📷)	18 July 1895	near Angra, Azores Islands (38°34'45"N, 29°37'W) {NEA}	Caught at surface (from sperm whale vomit) using shrimp net	Dubioteuthis physeteris Joubin, 1900 [=Architeuthis physeteris (Joubin, 1900)]	Mantle only	Mantle	Male	ML: 460 mm; BD: 115 mm; FL: 220 mm; FW: 110 mm; GL: 390 mm	MOM [station 588]; **holotype** of Dubioteuthis physeteris Joubin, 1900	Joubin (1900:102, pl. 15 figs. 8–10); Pfeffer (1912:24)	Hardy (1956:288); Roper & Young (1972:220); Toll & Hess (1981:753)	
[3] (📷)	18 July 1895	near Angra, Azores Islands (38°34'45"N, 29°37'W) {NEA}	Caught at surface (from sperm whale vomit) with shrimp net	Architeuthis sp.?; non-architeuthid	Several jaws	Undetermined		None		Joubin (1900:46, pl. 14 figs. 1–2)	Pfeffer (1912:27); Clarke (1956:257)	**Non-architeuthid.**
69 (📷)	10 April 1896	Kirkseteroren, Hevnefjorden, Norway {NEA}	Found washed ashore	Architeuthis dux Steenstrup, 1857	Entire	Entire	Female	BL: 2.5 m; AL: 2.5 m; TL: 7.25 m	VSM	Storm (1897:99); Grieg (1933:19)	Brinkmann (1916:178); Nordgård (1923:11); Nordgård (1928:71); Sivertsen (1955:11)	Model completed in 1954 based on this specimen and #70; restored in 2010.
70 (📷)	27 September 1896 [or 28 September]	Kirkseteroren, Hevnefjorden, Norway {NEA}	Found washed ashore	Architeuthis dux Steenstrup, 1857	Entire	Entire, posterior part missing	Male	TL: 1030+ mm; CL: 900 mm; CSC: 294; TSC: >298; LRL: 17.9 mm; URL: 16.2 mm; additional beak measurements, indices, and counts	VSM; VSM 110a [specimen NA-18 of Roeleveld (2000) and Roeleveld (2002)]	Storm (1897:99, fig. 20); Grieg (1933:19); Roeleveld (2000:185); Roeleveld (2002:727)	Brinkmann (1916:178, fig. 2); Nordgård (1923:11); Nordgård (1928:71); Sivertsen (1955:11); Toll & Hess (1981:753)	Beak morphometrics studied by Roeleveld (2000). Tentacle morphology examined by Roeleveld (2002). Model completed in 1954 based on this specimen and #69; restored in 2010.
71	Unknown (reported 1898)	Iceland {NEA}	Not stated	Architeuthis monachus	Not specified	Undetermined		None		Posselt (1898:279)	Bardarson (1920:134)	

=== Type specimens ===
The following table lists the nominal species-level taxa associated with the genus Architeuthis, together with their corresponding type specimens, type localities, and type repositories. Binomial names are listed alphabetically by specific epithet and presented in their original combinations.

Binomial name and author citation	Systematic status	Type locality	Type specimen and type repository
**Loligo bouyeri** Crosse & Fischer, 1862:138	Architeuthid?	Canary Islands?	(#18) Unresolved
**Architeuthis clarkei** Robson, 1933:682, text-figs. 1–7, pl. 1	Undetermined	Scarborough Beach, Yorkshire, England	(#107) BMNH Holotype 1933.1.30.5 + 1926.3.31.24 (radula and beak)
**Architeuthis dux** Steenstrup, 1857:183	Nomen tantum		
**Architeuthis dux** Steenstrup in Harting, 1860:11, pl. 1 fig. 1A	Valid species	31°N 76°W (Atlantic Ocean)	(#14) ZMUC Holotype
**Plectoteuthis grandis** Owen, 1881:156, pls. 34–35	Architeuthis sp.	Not indicated	(#27) BMNH Holotype [not traced by Lipiński et al. (2000)]
**Architeuthis halpertius** Aldrich, 1980:59	Nomen nudum (Note: Frederick Aldrich, who personally examined more than a dozen giant squid specimens, wrote that his largest specimen from Newfoundland bore tentacular suckers "approximately two inches [5.1 cm] in diameter" but that "[s]uckers and their toothed armament of over twelve inches [30 cm] in diameter have been found in the stomachs of sperm whale [sic] as indigestible wastes". This led him to entertain the idea of giant squid over 150 ft (46 m) long and even to suggest a binomial name for this super-sized species, were it ever to be discovered: Architeuthis halpertius (after folklorist Herbert Halpert). Aldrich restated this belief in "Monsters of the Deep", the second episode of the 1980 television series Arthur C. Clarke's Mysterious World: "I believe that the giant squid reach an approximate maximum size of something like a hundred and fifty feet [46 m]". Richard Ellis, apparently unaware of Aldrich's similar statements in print, commented: "It is difficult to imagine why Aldrich would have made such an irresponsible statement, unless it had to do with being on camera". Arthur C. Clarke himself wrote in 1992 that "the evidence suggests, they [giant squid] grow up to 150 feet in length". The published literature includes many other such extreme size estimates based only on supposed giant squid suckers or scars thereof.)		
**Loligo hartingii** Verrill, 1875b:86, fig. 28	Valid species; Architeuthis hartingii	Not indicated	(#16) University of Utrecht as Architeuthis dux, identification by Harting
**Megaloteuthis harveyi** Kent, 1874a:181	Architeuthis sp.	Conception Bay, Newfoundland	(#29) YPM Type 12600y
**Architeuthis japonica** Pfeffer, 1912:27	Undetermined	Tokyo Bay, Japan	(#67) Undetermined; Holotype [=Mitsukuri & Ikeda (1895:39–50, pl. 10)]
**Architeuthis kirkii** Robson, 1887:155	Architeuthis stockii (Kirk, 1882)	Cape Campbell, New Zealand	(#61) NMNZ Holotype M.125404 + ?M.125406
**Architeuthis longimanus** Kirk, 1888:34, pls. 7–9	Architeuthis stockii (Kirk, 1882)	Lyall Bay, New Zealand	(#62) NMNZ Holotype; specimen not located
**Megateuthis martensii** Hilgendorf, 1880:67	Valid species; Architeuthis martensii	Yedo Japan fish market, Japan	(#28) ZMB Moll. 34716 + 38980
**Architeuthis megaptera** Verrill, 1878:207	**Non-architeuthid**; Sthenoteuthis pteropus (Steenstrup, 1855)	Nova Scotia, Canada	(#[1]) NSMC 1870–Z-2
**Architeuthis? monachus** Steenstrup, 1857:184	Nomen tantum		
**Architeuthis monachus** Steenstrup in Harting, 1860:11	Architeuthis dux Steenstrup, 1857	Raabjerg Strand; Northwest coast of Jutland, Denmark	(#13) ZMUC Holotype
**Architeuthis mouchezi** Vélain, 1875:1002	Nomen nudum; see Mouchezis sancti-pauli		
**Architeuthis nawaji** Cadenat, 1935:513	Undetermined	Île d'Yeu, Bay of Biscay, France	(#110) Unresolved
**Dubioteuthis physeteris** Joubin, 1900:102, pl. 15	Valid species; Architeuthis physeteris	Azores (38°34'45"N 29°37'W); from sperm whale stomach	(#68) MOM Holotype [station 588]
**Architeuthis princeps** Verrill, 1875a:22	Nomen nudum		
**Architeuthis princeps** Verrill, 1875b:79, figs. 25–27	Undetermined	a) Grand Banks, Newfoundland; b) North Atlantic (sperm whale stomach)	(#22 and 26) NMNH? [not found in collections to date]; Syntypes (a) Verrill specimen No. 1, lower beak; b) Verrill specimen No. 10, upper and lower beak)
**Dinoteuthis proboscideus** More, 1875a:4527	Architeuthis sp.	Dingle, County Kerry, Ireland	(#3) Unresolved
**Mouchezis sancti-pauli** Vélain, 1877:81, text-fig. 8	Valid species; Architeuthis sanctipauli	on beach, St. Paul Island (38°43′S 77°32′E), South Indian Ocean	(#33) MNHN Holotype 3-2-658 and 3-2-659 (tentacular clubs only)
**Steenstrupia stockii** Kirk, 1882:286, pl. 36 figs. 2–4	Valid species; Architeuthis stockii [Architeuthid per Pfeffer (1912:2)]	Cook Strait, New Zealand	(#47) NMNZ Holotype M.125405 + M.125403
**Architeuthis titan** Steenstrup in Verrill, 1875b:84 [in Verrill (1881b:238, footnote)]	Nomen nudum		
**Architeuthis verrilli** Kirk, 1882:284, pl. 36 fig. 1	Species dubium	Island Bay, Cook Strait, New Zealand	(#55) NMNZ Holotype; [see Förch (1998:89)]

== Abbreviations ==
The following abbreviations are used in the List of giant squid table.

=== Oceanic sectors ===
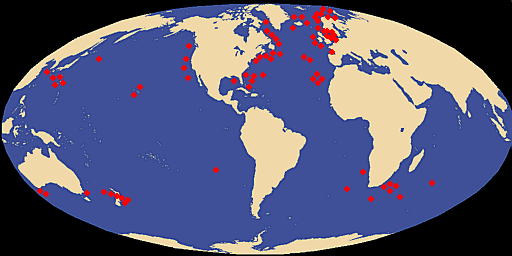
Worldwide giant squid distribution based on recovered specimens

Oceanic sectors used in the main table follow Sweeney & Roper (2001): the Atlantic Ocean is divided into sectors at the equator and 30°W, the Pacific Ocean is divided at the equator and 180°, and the Indian Ocean is defined as the range 20°E to 115°E (the Arctic and Southern Oceans are not distinguished). An additional category has been created to accommodate the handful of specimens recorded from the Mediterranean Sea.

- NEA, Northeast Atlantic Ocean
- NWA, Northwest Atlantic Ocean
- SEA, Southeast Atlantic Ocean
- SWA, Southwest Atlantic Ocean
- NEP, Northeast Pacific Ocean
- NWP, Northwest Pacific Ocean
- SEP, Southeast Pacific Ocean
- SWP, Southwest Pacific Ocean
- NIO, Northern Indian Ocean
- SIO, Southern Indian Ocean
- MED, Mediterranean Sea

=== Measurements ===
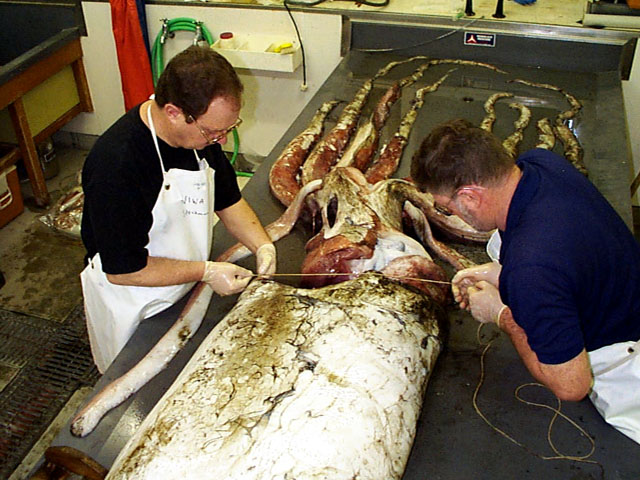
Measuring mantle width

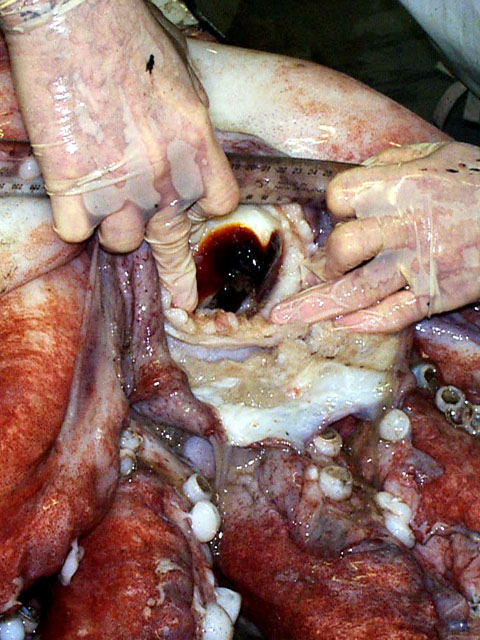
Measuring beak dimensions

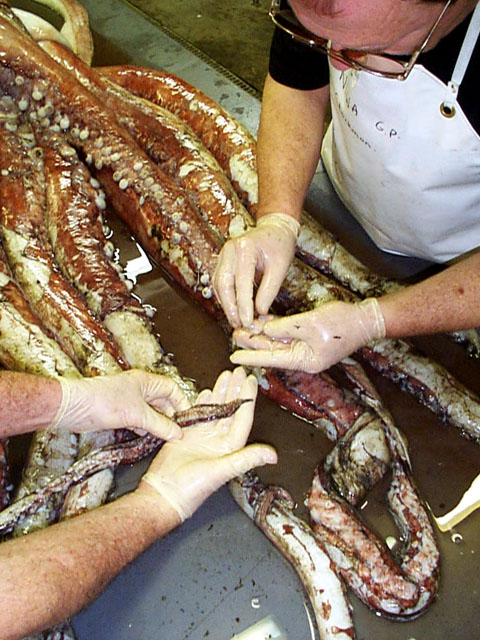
Taking sucker counts

Abbreviations used for measurements and counts follow Sweeney & Roper (2001) and are based on standardised acronyms in teuthology, primarily those defined by Roper & Voss (1983), with the exception of several found in older references. Following Sweeney & Roper (2001), the somewhat non-standard EL ("entire" length) and WL ("whole" length) are used in place of the more common TL (usually total length; here tentacle length) and SL (usually standard length; here spermatophore length), respectively.

- AC, arm circumference (AC(I), AC(II), AC(III) and AC(IV) refer to measurements of specific arm pairs)
- AD, arm diameter (AD(I), AD(II), AD(III) and AD(IV) refer to measurements of specific arm pairs)
- AF, arm formula
- AL, arm length (AL(I), AL(II), AL(III) and AL(IV) refer to measurements of specific arm pairs)
- ASC, arm sucker count
- ASD, arm sucker diameter
- BAC, buccal apparatus circumference
- BAL, buccal apparatus length
- BC, body circumference (assumed to mean greatest circumference of mantle unless otherwise specified)
- BD, body diameter (assumed to mean greatest diameter of mantle)
- BL, body length (usually equivalent to mantle length, as head length is often given separately)
- CaL, carpus length
- CL, club length (usually refers to expanded portion at the apex of tentacle)
- CSC, club sucker count
- CSD, club sucker diameter (usually largest) [usually equivalent to LSD]
- CW, club width
- DC, dactylus club length
- EC, egg count
- ED, egg diameter
- EL, "entire" length (end of tentacle(s), often stretched, to posterior tip of tail; in contrast to WL, measured from end of arms to posterior tip of tail)
- EyD, eye diameter
- EyOD, eye orbit diameter
- FL, fin length
- FuCL, funnel cartilage length
- FuCW, funnel cartilage width
- FuD, funnel opening diameter
- FuL, funnel length
- FW, fin width
- GiL, gill length
- GL, gladius (pen) length
- GW, gladius (pen) width
- G(W), daily growth rate (%)
- HC, head circumference
- HeL, hectocotylus length
- HL, head length (most often base of arms to edge of mantle)
- HW, head width
- LAL, longest arm length
- LRL, lower rostral length of beak
- LSD, largest sucker diameter (on tentacle club) [usually equivalent to CSD]
- MaL, manus length
- ML, dorsal mantle length (used only where stated as such)
- MT, mantle thickness
- MW, maximum mantle width (used only where stated as such)
- NGL, nidamental gland length
- PL, penis length
- RaL, radula length
- RaW, radula width
- RL, rachis length
- RW, rachis width
- SInc, number of statolith increments
- SL, spermatophore length
- SoA, spermatophores on arms
- SSD, stalk sucker diameter
- SSL, spermatophore sac length
- TaL, tail length
- TC, tentacle circumference (most often of tentacle stalk)
- TCL, tentacle club length
- TD, tentacle diameter (most often of tentacle stalk)
- TL, tentacle length
- TSC, tentacle sucker count (club and stalk combined)
- TSD, tentacle sucker diameter (usually largest)
- URL, upper rostral length of beak
- VML, ventral mantle length
- WL, "whole" length (end of arms, often damaged, to posterior tip of tail; in contrast to EL, measured from end of tentacles to posterior tip of tail)
- WT, weight

=== Repositories ===
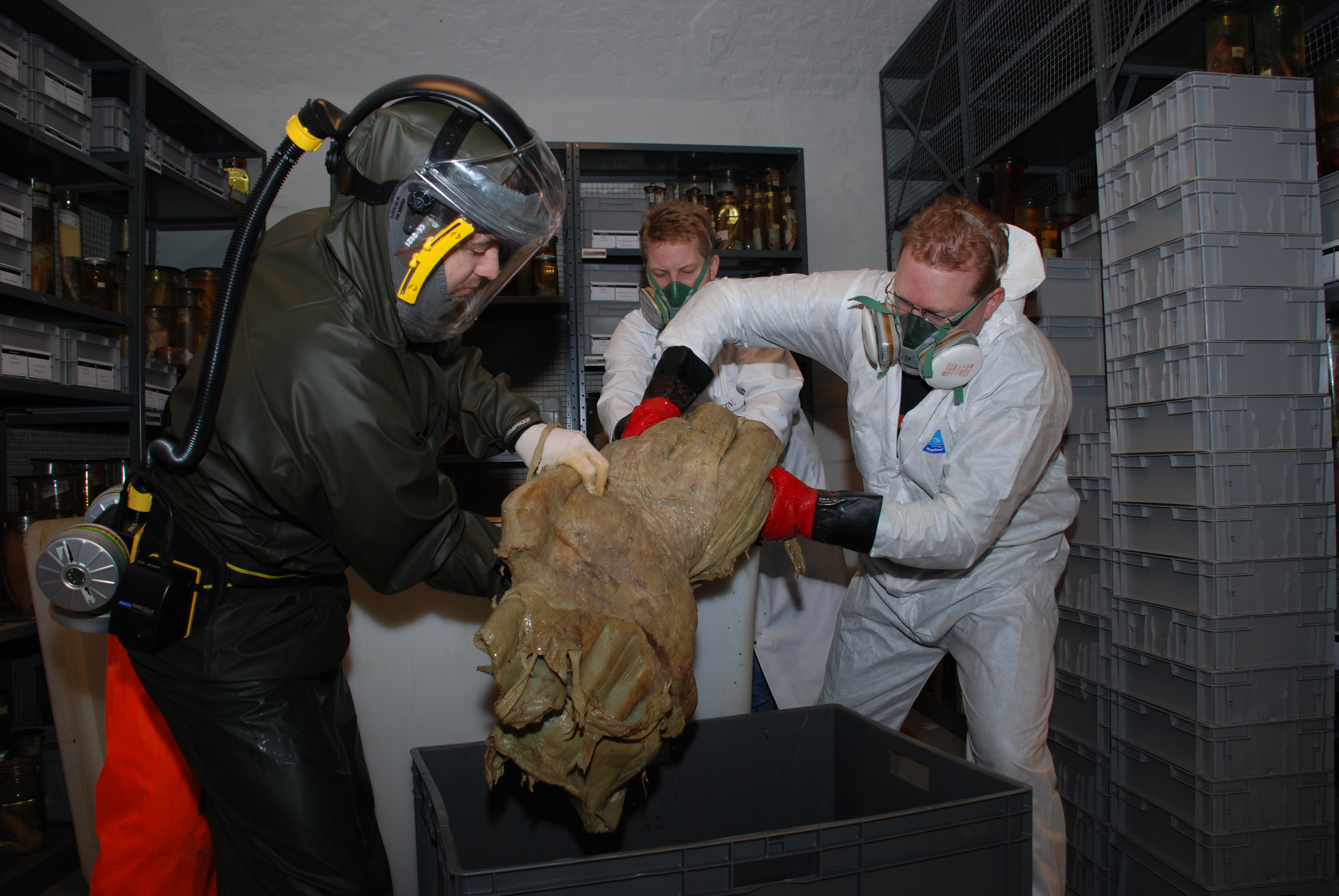
Giant squid head being removed from storage at the VSM in Trondheim, Norway

Institutional acronyms follow Sweeney & Roper (2001) and are primarily those defined by Leviton et al. (1985), Leviton & Gibbs (1988), and Sabaj (2016). Where the acronym is unknown, the full repository name is listed.

- AMNH, American Museum of Natural History, New York City, New York, United States
- AMS, Australian Museum, Sydney, New South Wales, Australia
- BAMZ, Bermuda Aquarium, Museum and Zoo, Flatts Village, Bermuda
- BMNH, Natural History Museum, Cromwell Road, London, England (formerly British Museum (Natural History))
- CEPESMA, Museo-Aula del Mar, Coordinadora para el Estudio y la Protección de las Especies Marinas, Luarca, Spain
- EI, Essex Institute, Salem, Massachusetts, United States
- FOSJ, Department of Fisheries and Oceans, St. John's, Newfoundland, Canada
- ICM, Instituto de Ciencias del Mar, Barcelona, Spain
- MCNOPM, Museo de Ciencias Naturales de Puerto Madryn (Museum of Natural Sciences and Oceanography), Puerto Madryn, Argentina
- MHNLR, Muséum national d'histoire naturelle, La Rochelle, France
- MHNN, Muséum national d'histoire naturelle (Musee Barla), Nice, France
- MMF, Museu Municipal do Funchal, Funchal, Madeira
- MNHN, Muséum national d'histoire naturelle, Paris, France
- MOM, Musée Océanographique, Monaco
- MUDB, Department of Biology, Memorial University, Newfoundland, Canada
- NIWA, National Institute of Water and Atmospheric Research, Wellington, New Zealand
- NMI, National Museum of Ireland – Natural History, Dublin, Ireland
- NMML, National Marine Mammal Laboratory, Alaska Fisheries Science Center, Seattle, Washington, United States
- NMNH, National Museum of Natural History, Smithsonian Institution, Washington, District of Columbia, United States
- NMNZ, Museum of New Zealand Te Papa Tongarewa, Wellington, New Zealand (formerly Colonial Museum; Dominion Museum)
- NMSJ, Newfoundland Museum, St. John's, Newfoundland, Canada
- NMSZ, National Museum of Scotland, Zoology Department, Edinburgh, Scotland (formerly Royal Museum of Scotland; formerly Royal Scottish Museum, Edinburgh)
- NMV, Museum Victoria, Melbourne, Victoria, Australia (formerly National Museum of Victoria)
- NSMC, Nova Scotia Museum, Halifax, Canada
- PASS, Peabody Academy of Science, Salem, Massachusetts, United States (now in Peabody Museum of Salem?)
- RMNH, Naturalis Biodiversity Center, Leiden, Netherlands
- RSMAS, Rosenstiel School of Marine, Atmospheric, and Earth Science, Miami, Florida, United States (= UMML, University of Miami Marine Lab)
- SAM, Iziko South African Museum, Cape Town, South Africa
- SAMA, South Australian Museum, North Terrace, Adelaide, Australia
- SBMNH, Santa Barbara Museum of Natural History, Santa Barbara, California, United States
- SMNH, Swedish Museum of Natural History, Stockholm, Sweden
- TMAG, Tasmanian Museum and Art Gallery, Hobart, Tasmania, Australia
- VSM, NTNU Museum of Natural History and Archaeology, Trondheim, Norway (formerly Det Kgl. Norske Videnskabers Selskab Museet)
- YPM, Peabody Museum of Natural History, Yale University, New Haven, Connecticut, United States
- ZMB, Zoologisches Museum, Museum für Naturkunde der Humboldt University of Berlin, Berlin, Germany
- ZMMGU, Zoological Museum, Lomonosov Moscow State University, Moscow, Russia
- ZMUB, Universitetet i Bergen, Bergen, Norway
- ZMUC, Kobenhavns Universitet, Zoologisk Museum, Copenhagen, Denmark

== Specimen images ==
The following images relate to pre–20th century giant squid specimens and sightings. The number below each image corresponds to that given in the List of giant squid table and is linked to the relevant record therein. The date on which the specimen was first documented is also given (the little-endian day/month/year date format is used throughout).

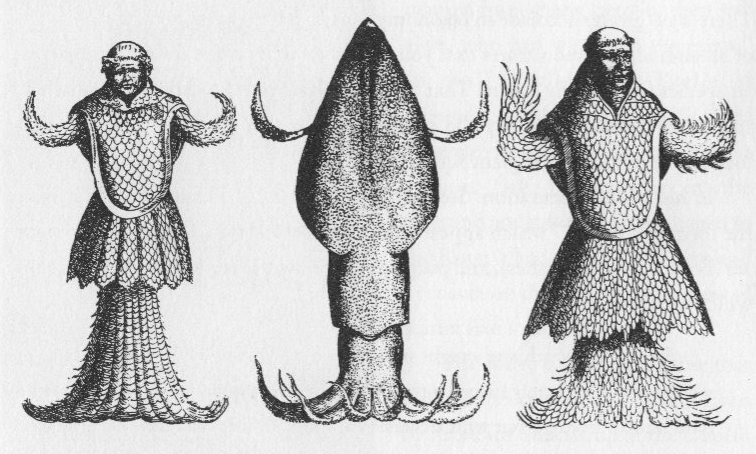
#1 (c. 1546)
Japetus Steenstrup's comparison of a common squid (centre; its tentacles in an anatomically implausible position) with two 16th century drawings of the "sea monk of the Øresund"—Guillaume Rondelet's (1554:492, fig.) on the left and Pierre Belon's (1553:39, fig.) on the right (Steenstrup, 1855a:83, fig.). It has been noted that Steenstrup's reproductions differ somewhat from the 16th century originals.

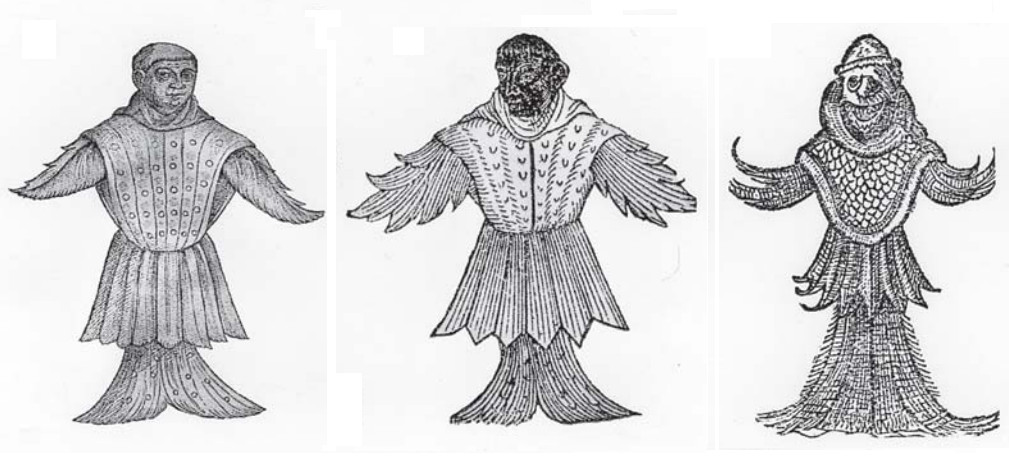
#1 (c. 1546)
Three further 16th century depictions of the "sea monk of the Øresund", possibly a giant squid or an angelshark (Squatina squatina), from the works of (left to right): Stefan Hamer (1546:[1], fig.), Conrad Lycosthenes (1557:609, fig.), and Johannes Sluperius (1572:105, fig.), as collected in Paxton & Holland (2005:41, fig. 1).

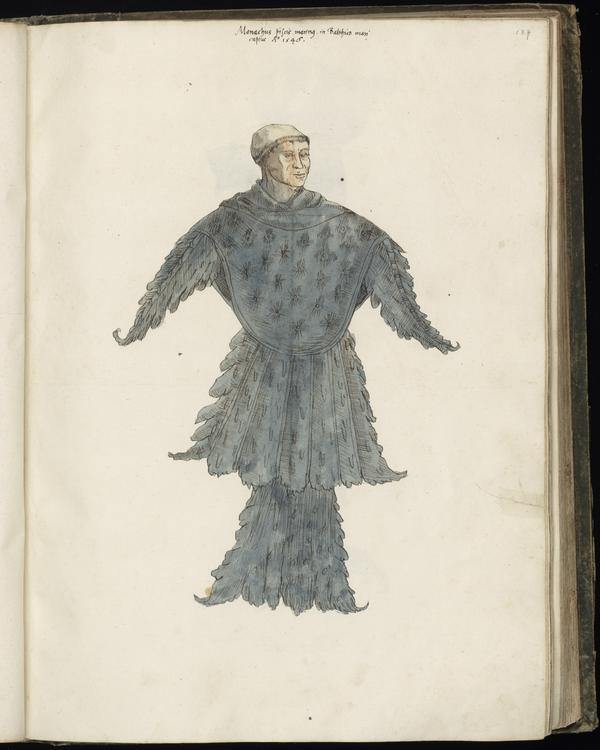
#1 (c. 1546)
Watercolour of the sea monk by an anonymous artist, from the so-called Gessner Albums kept at the University of Amsterdam. These illustrations were collected by Felix Platter to serve as the basis for the woodcuts in Conrad Gessner's encyclopedic Historia animalium, the first modern zoological work to attempt to describe all known animal species (see Gessner, 1558:519, fig. for sea monk depiction published therein).

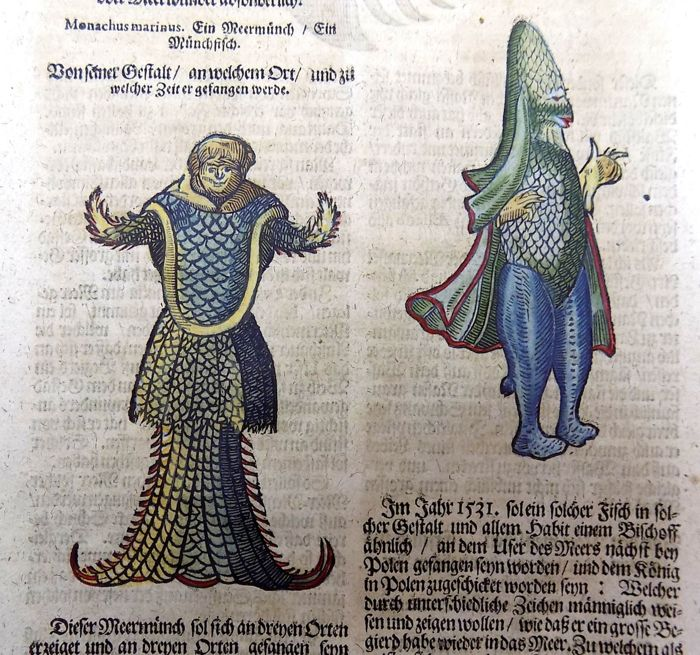
#1 (c. 1546)
Painted woodcuts of the sea monk (#1; left) and sea bishop (the latter also thought by some to be based on a giant squid), issued in 1669 and based on Conrad Gessner's originals from 1558 (themselves based on Rondelet's).

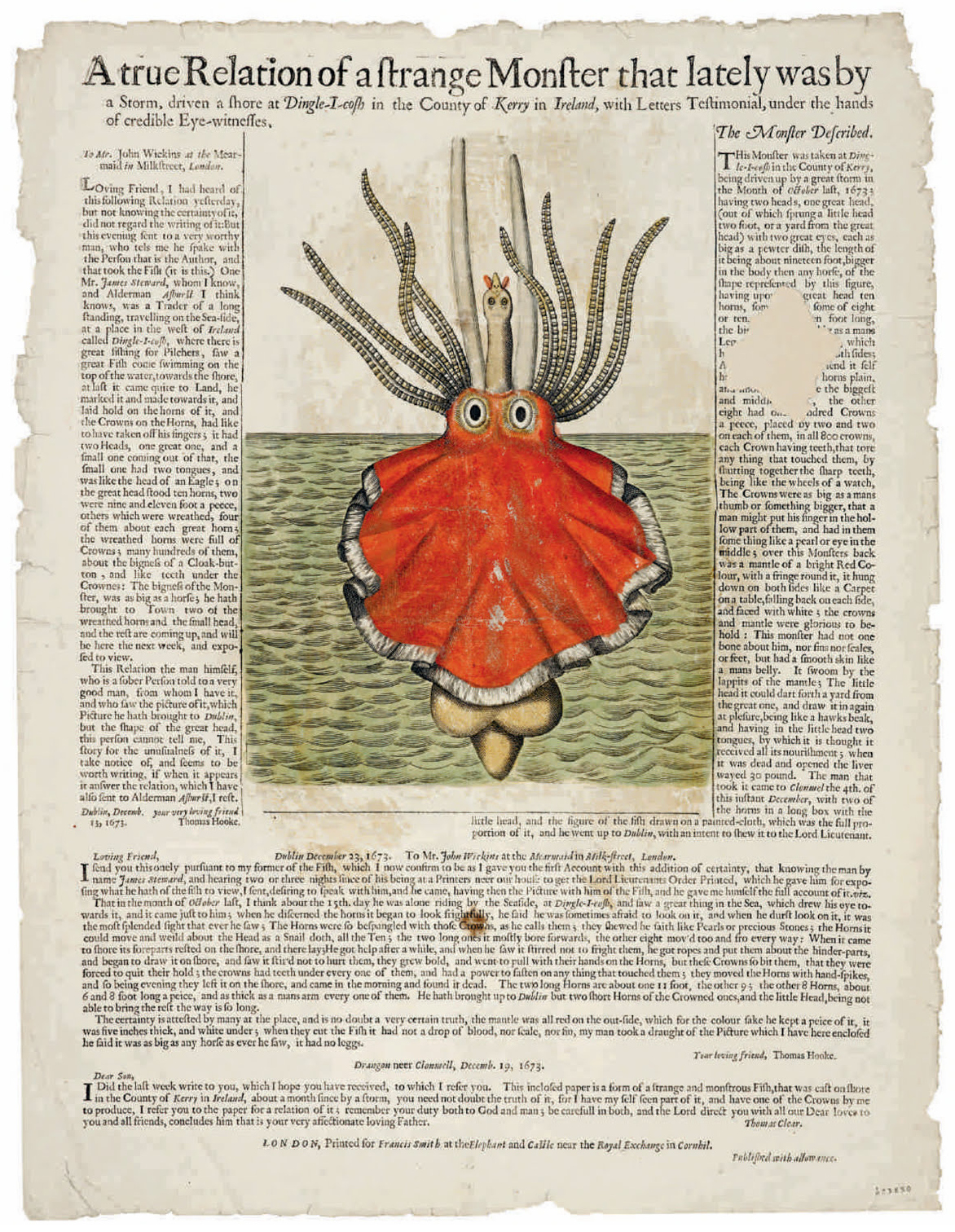
#3 (c. 15/10/1673)
Broadsheet covering the giant squid stranded at Dingle, Ireland, around 15 October 1673 (Hooke et al., c. 1674). Steve O'Shea commented that though the animal depicted "doesn't look true to any squid, it is probably more similar to a cranchiid than it is to an architeuthid".

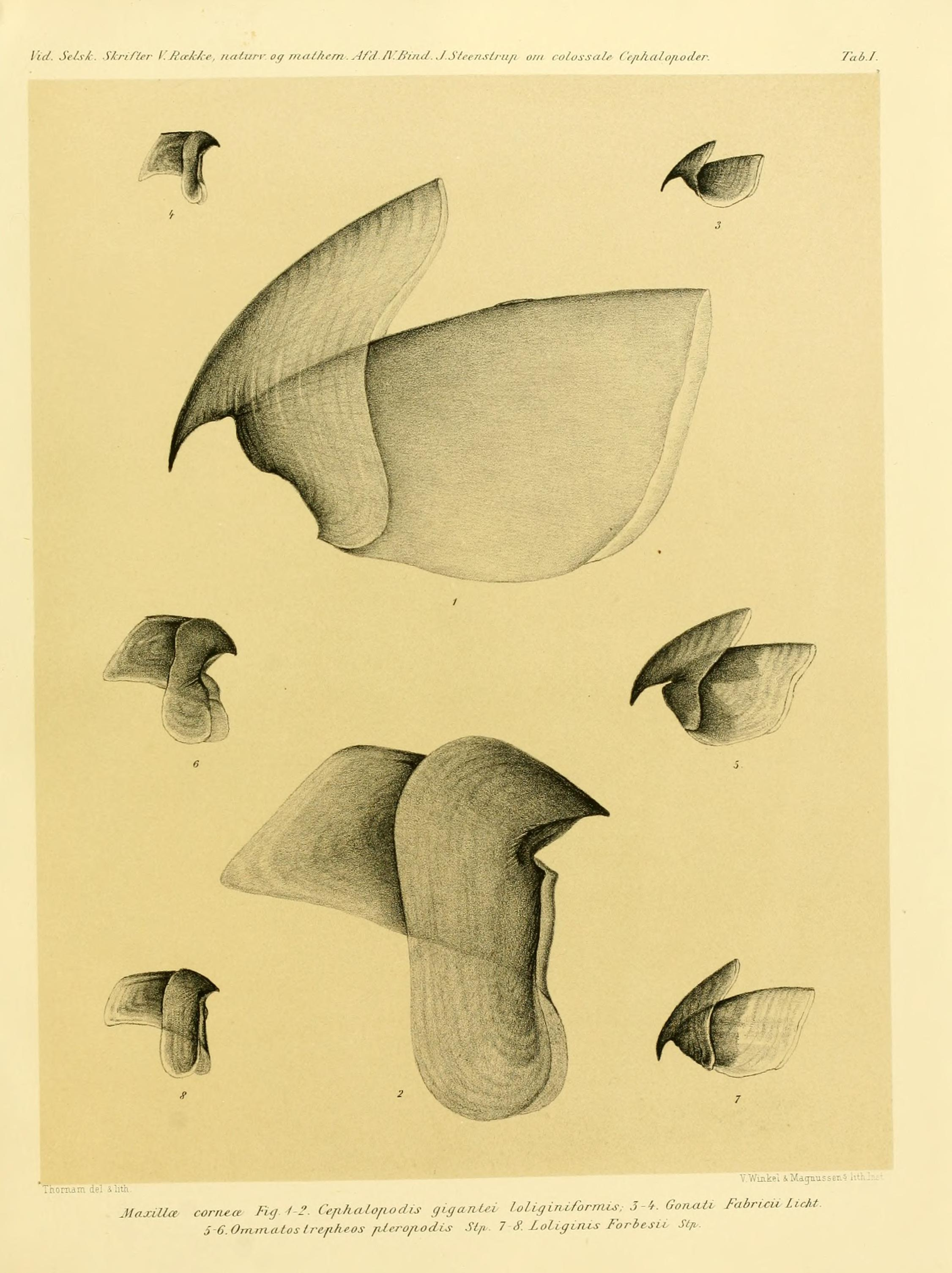
#13 (?/12/1853)
Upper and lower beaks of the type specimen of Architeuthis monachus (centre) and assorted smaller squid species: Gonatus fabricii (top), Sthenoteuthis pteropus (middle), and Loligo forbesii (bottom) (Steenstrup, 1898:pl. 1)

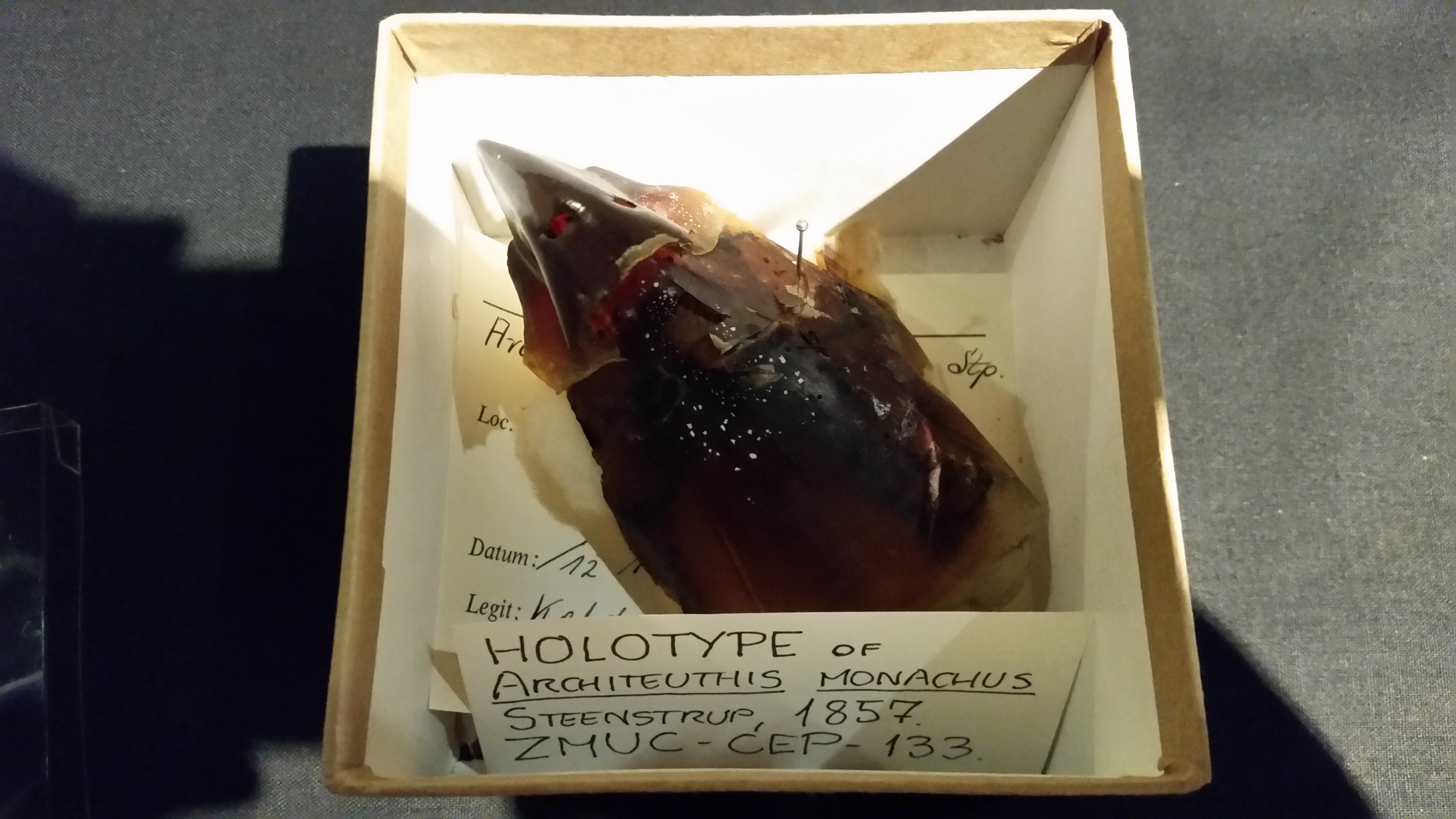
#13 (?/12/1853)
Holotype of Architeuthis monachus at the Zoological Museum in Copenhagen, as it appeared in 2015. It consists of a dried beak, the sole part of the animal that was preserved.

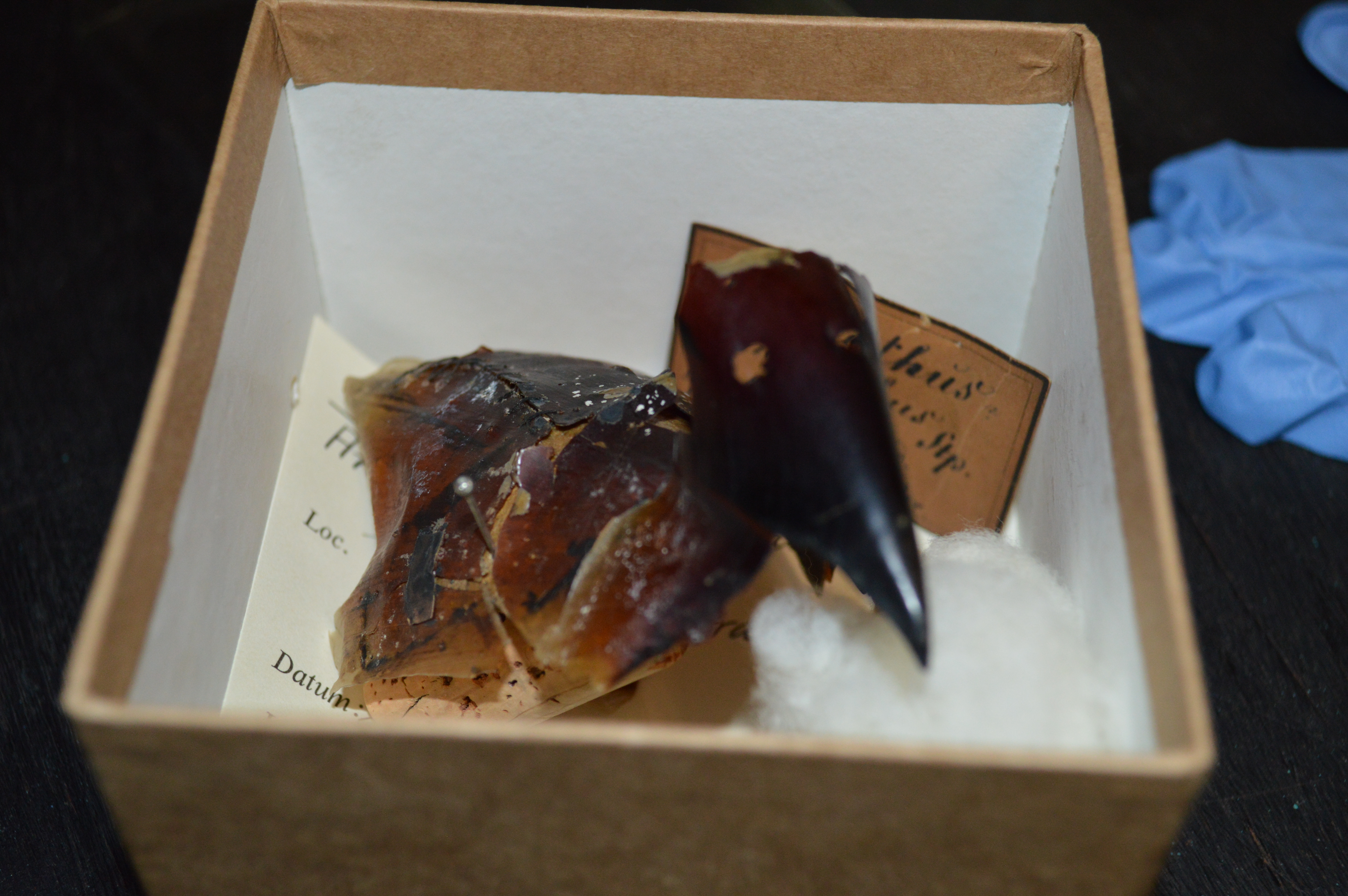
#13 (?/12/1853)
Another view of the same specimen, showing areas where damage has been patched up with tape and repaired with sutures (see also original label and assorted beak fragments)

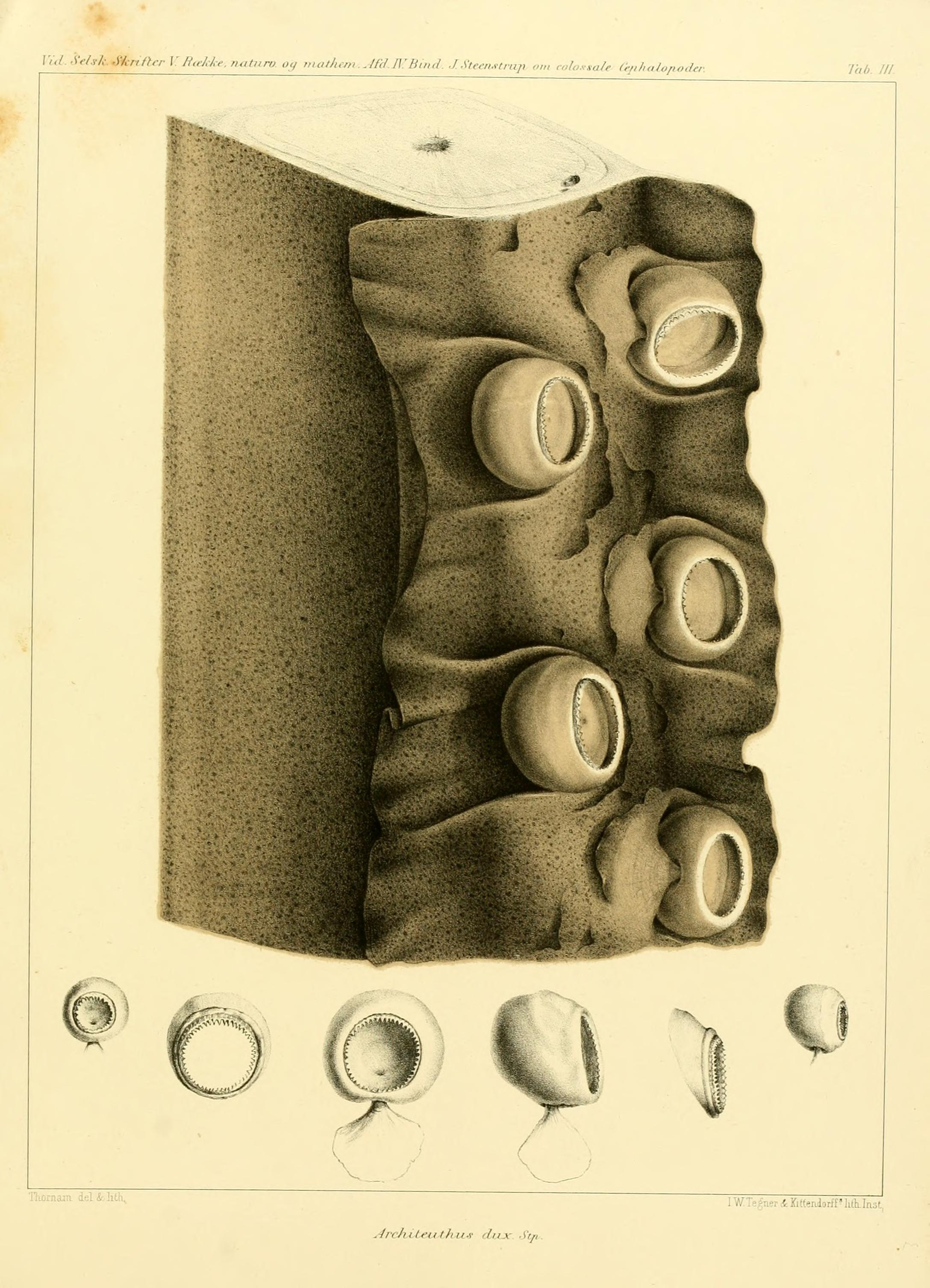
#14 (5/11/1855)
Arm fragment and associated suckers of the type specimen of Architeuthis dux, collected off the Bahamas on 5 November 1855 (Steenstrup, 1898:pl. 3)

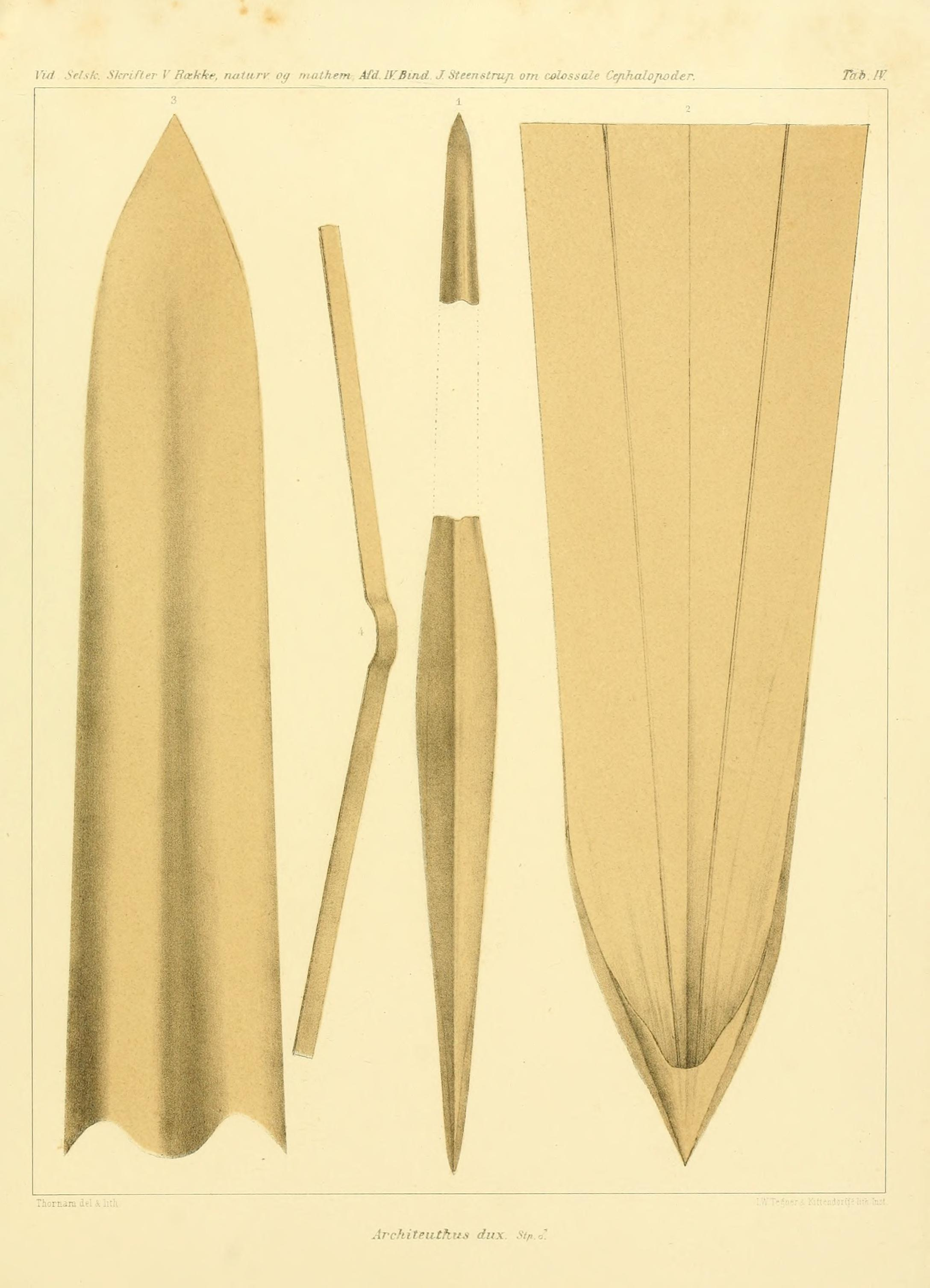
#14 (5/11/1855)
Gladius (internal shell remnant) of the same specimen (Steenstrup, 1898:pl. 4)

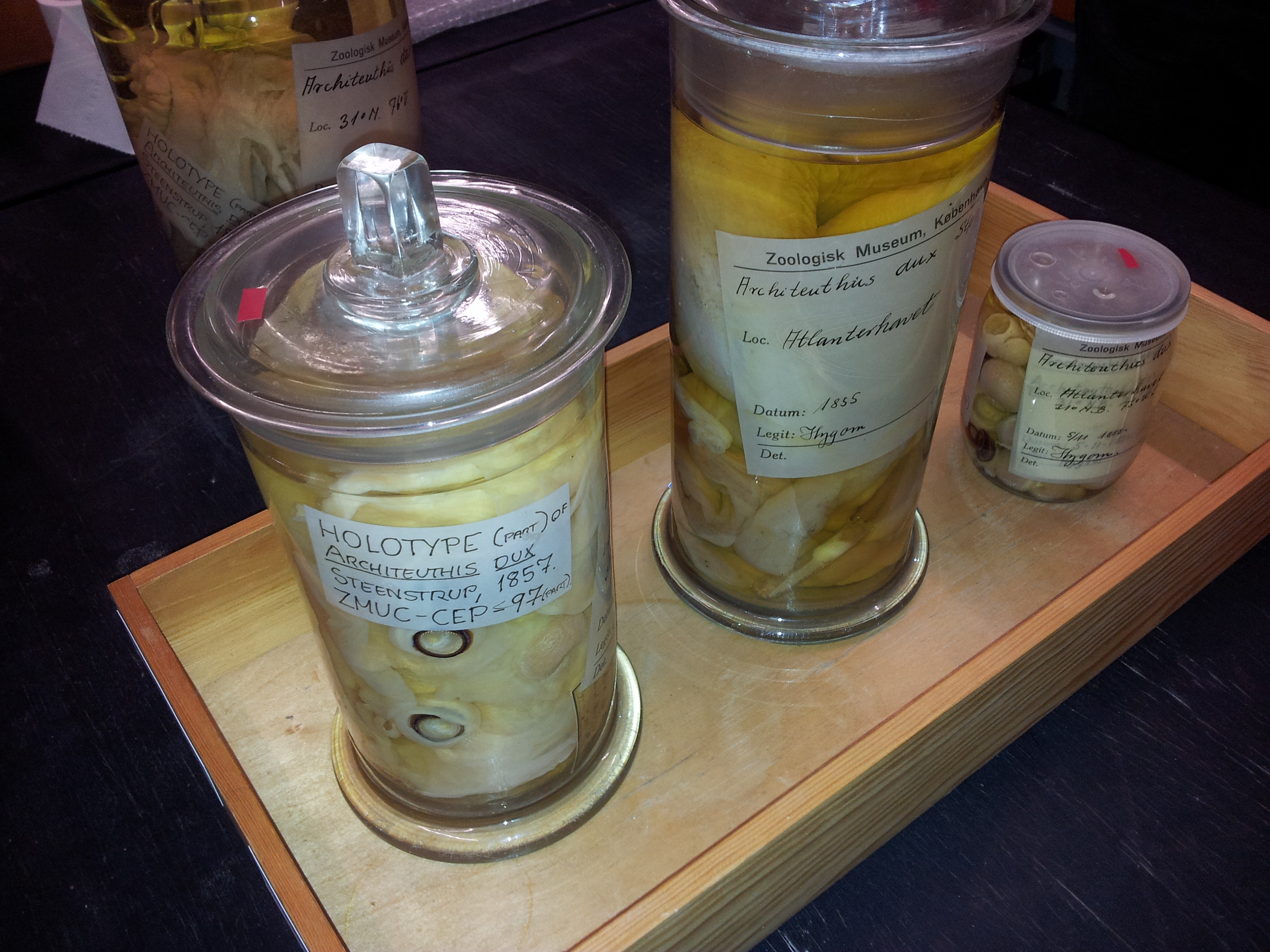
#14 (5/11/1855)
Four jars containing soft tissue remains of the Architeuthis dux holotype, from the collections of the Zoological Museum in Copenhagen (as they appeared in 2013)

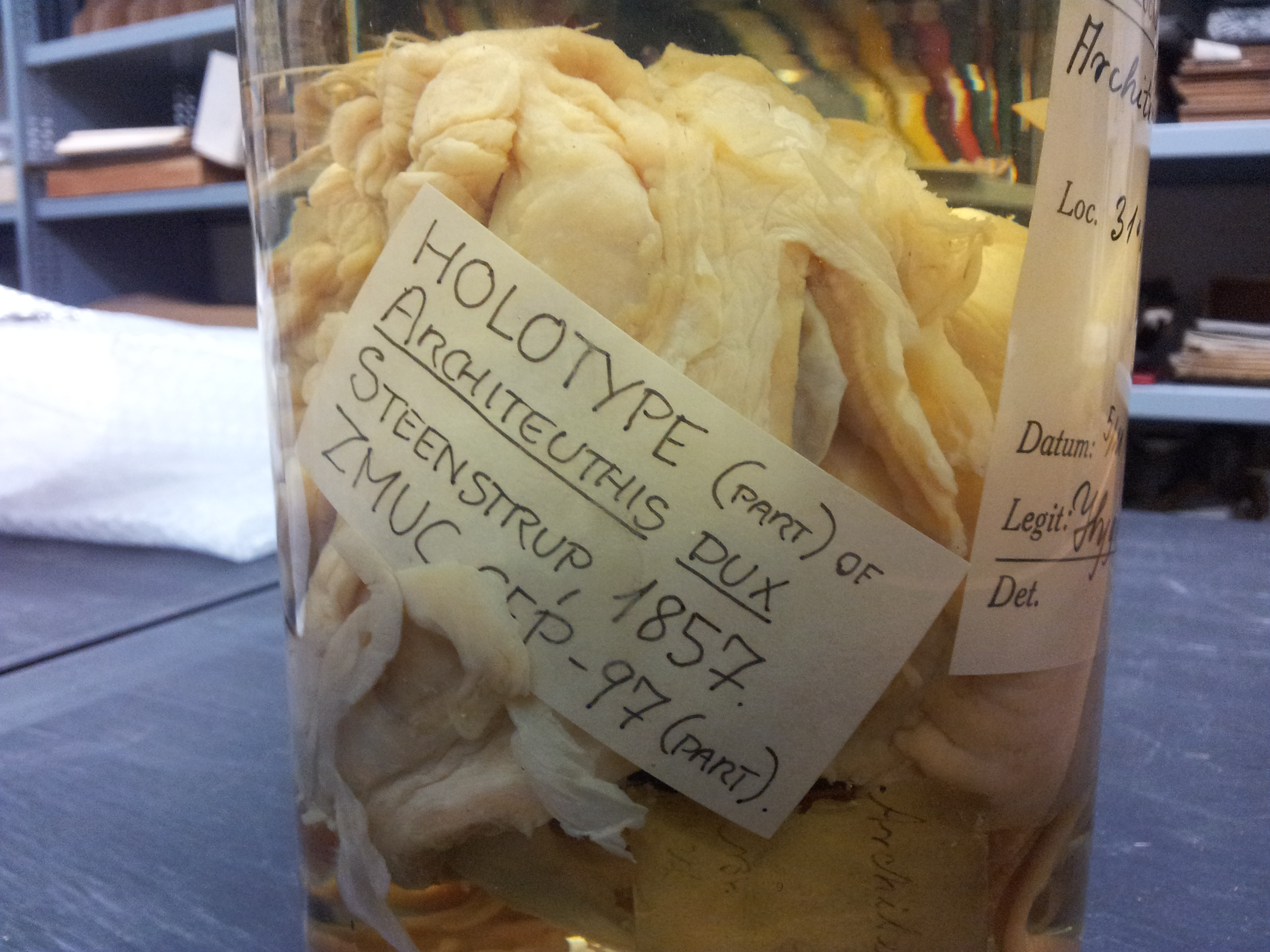
#14 (5/11/1855)
Closeup of one of the jars containing the Architeuthis dux type material (see alternative view)

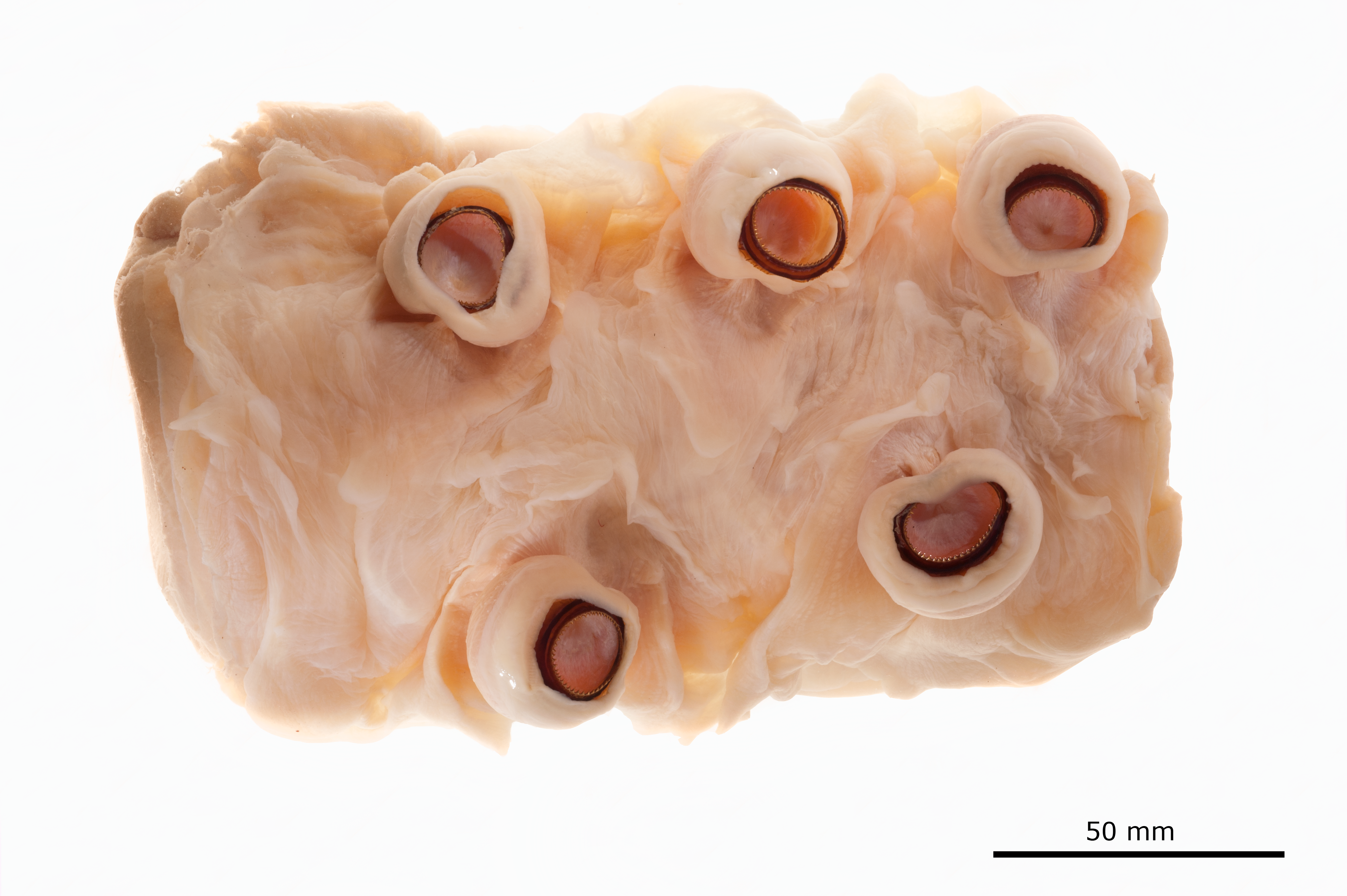
#14 (5/11/1855)
Arm fragment of the Architeuthis dux holotype (see also detail of one of the suckers)

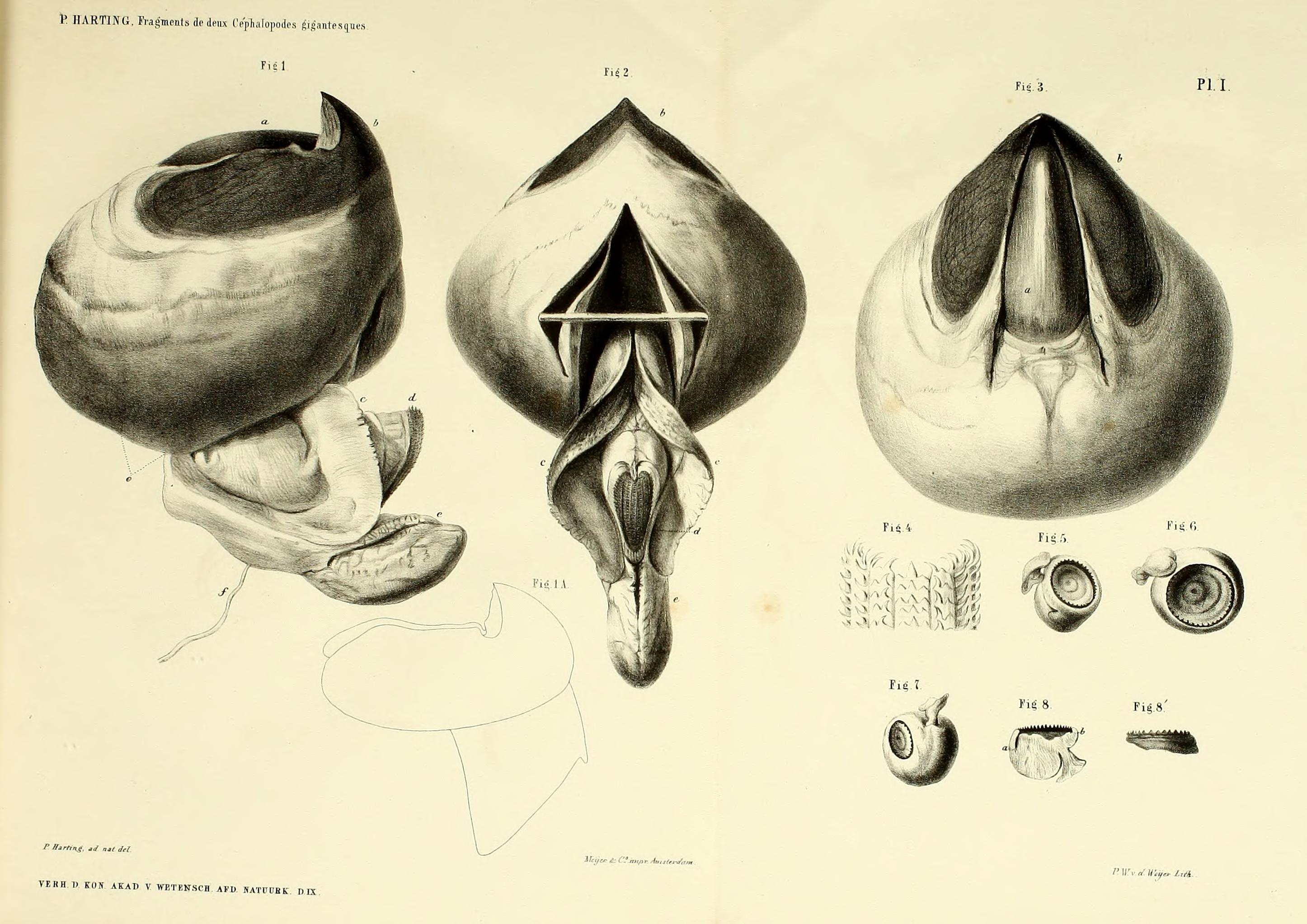
#16 (≤1860)
Beak with associated buccal musculature, radula, and loose suckers of the type specimen of Loligo (later Architeuthis) hartingii, the provenance of which is unknown (Harting, 1860:pl. 1)

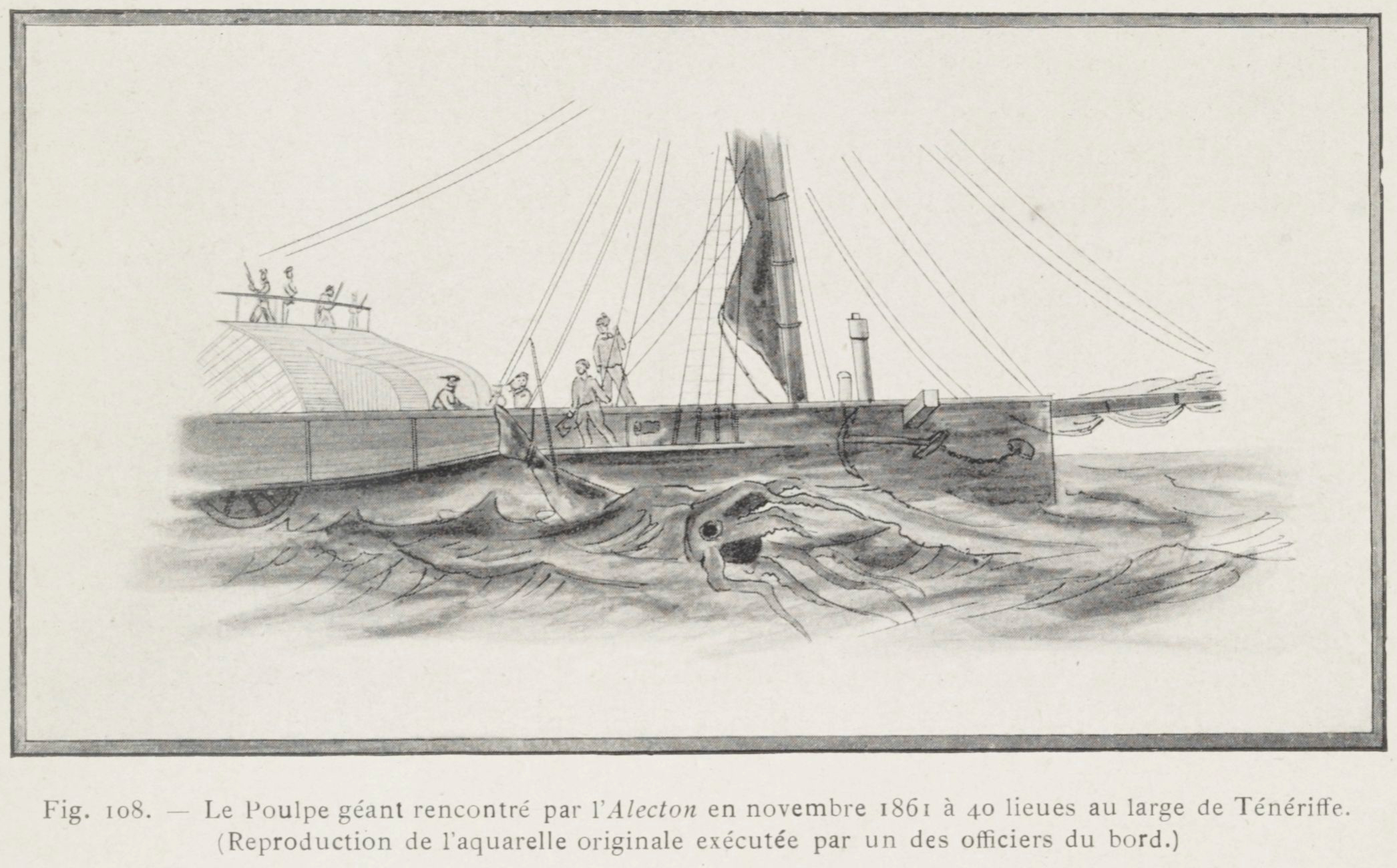
#18 (30/11/1861)
The French corvette Alecton attempts to capture a giant squid off Tenerife on 30 November 1861. Reproduction of the original watercolour by officers of the Alecton, from Bourée (1912:115, fig. 108).

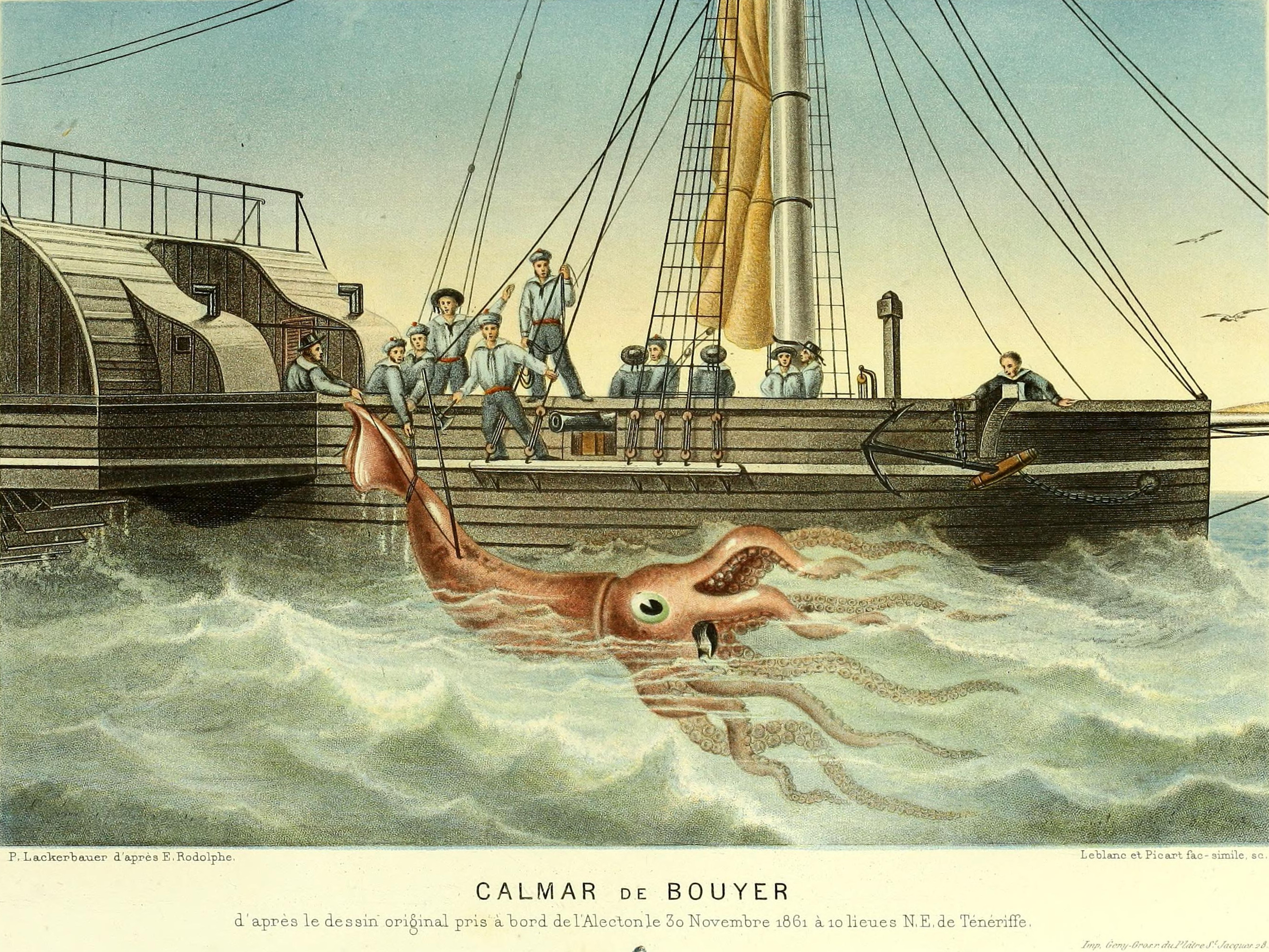
#18 (30/11/1861)
An 1865 illustration of the Alecton incident by P. Lackerbauer, clearly based on the officers' watercolour. It appeared in the first edition of Alfred Moquin-Tandon's Le Monde de la Mer, which he published under the pseudonym "Alfred Frédol" (Frédol, 1865:314, pl. 13).

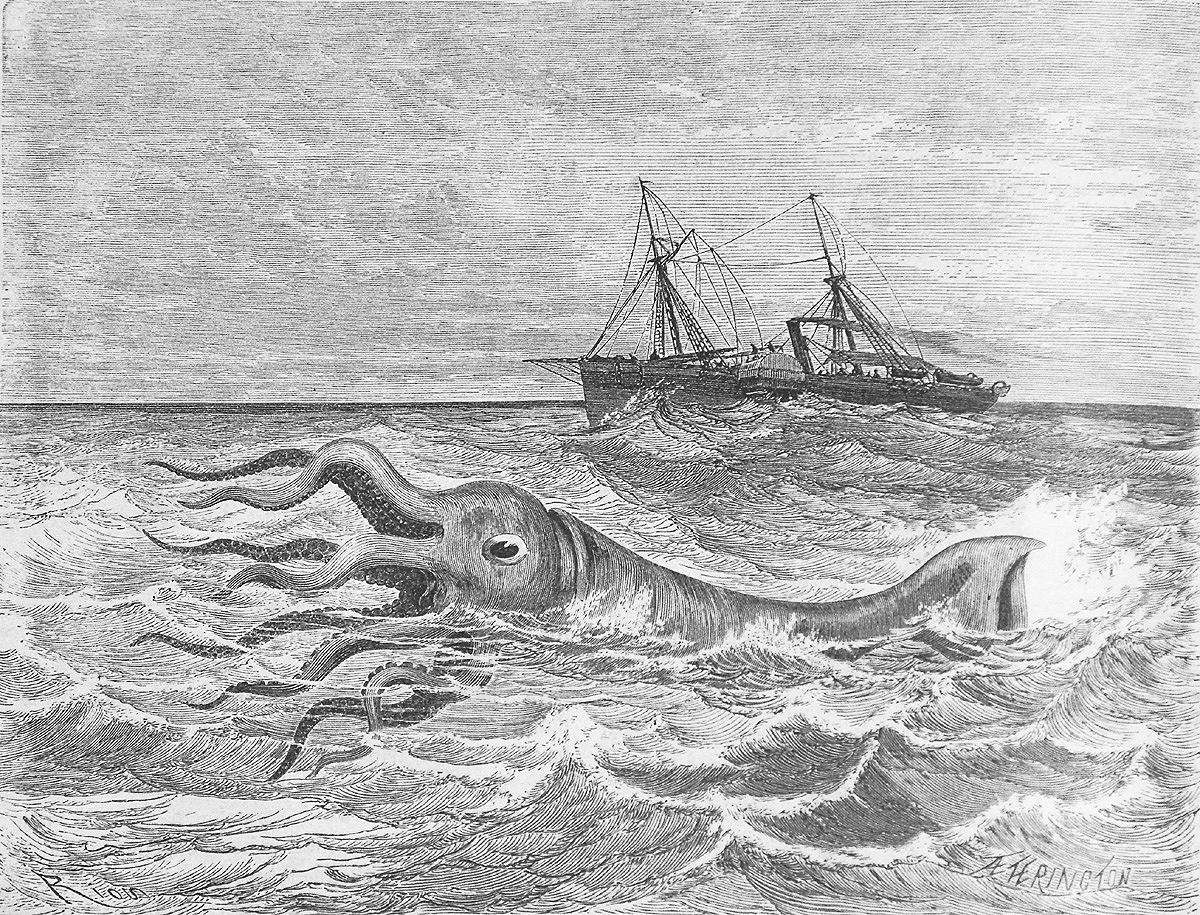
#18 (30/11/1861)
Another depiction of the encounter, by Édouard Riou (credited in caption) and A. Etherington (signed), based on a sketch by ensign E. Rodolphe, an officer on the Alecton. This engraving appeared in Bouyer (1866:276, fig.) and subsequently featured in other publications, including an 1867 issue of the Dutch travel magazine De Aarde en haar Volken (from which the present image was extracted).

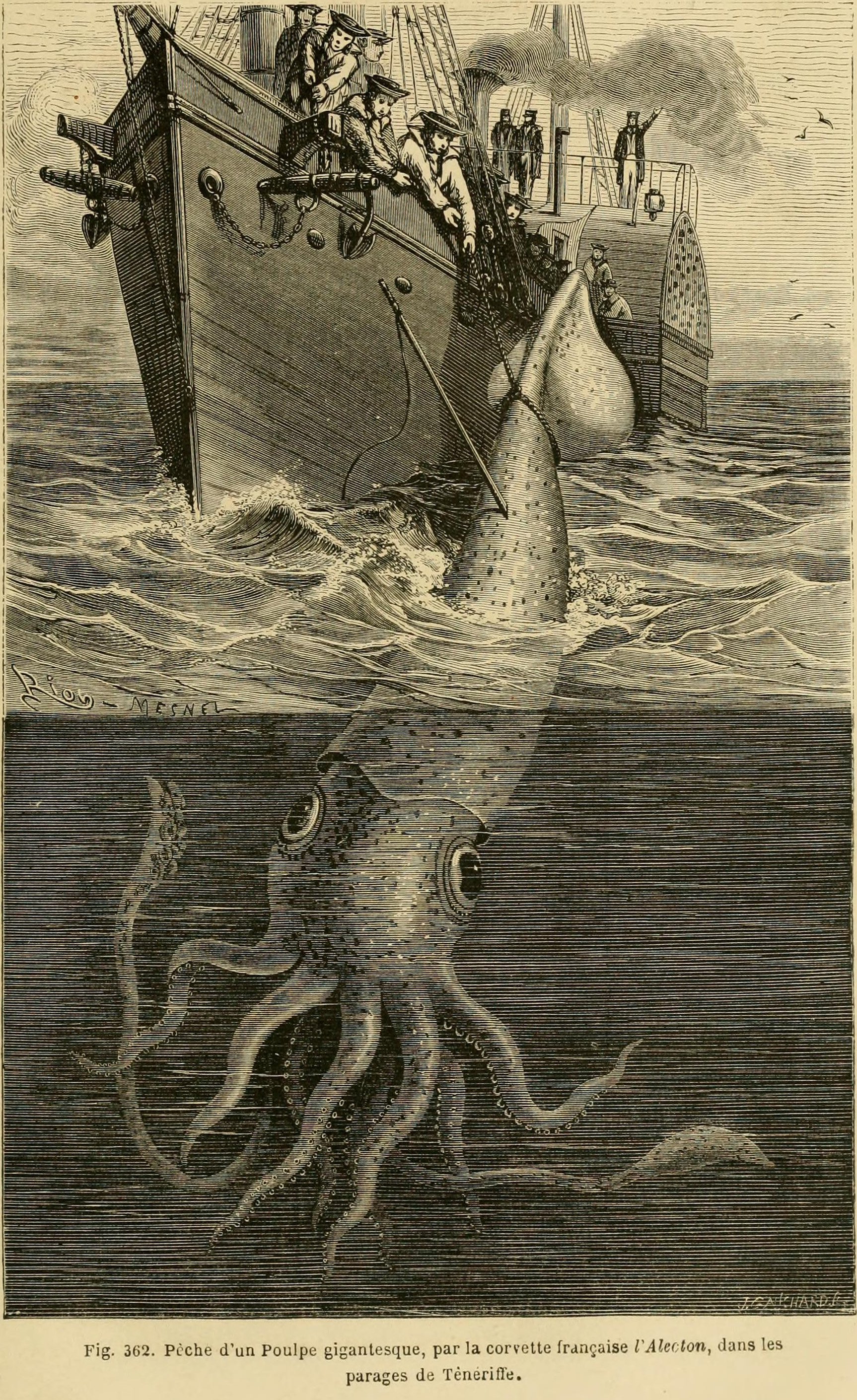
#18 (30/11/1861)
This much-reproduced image appeared in Louis Figuier's La vie et les mœurs des animaux (Figuier, 1866:467, fig. 362; shown here) and Henry Lee's Sea Monsters Unmasked (Lee, 1883:39, fig. 8), among others, but Muntz (1995:21) wrote that its original source was uncertain.

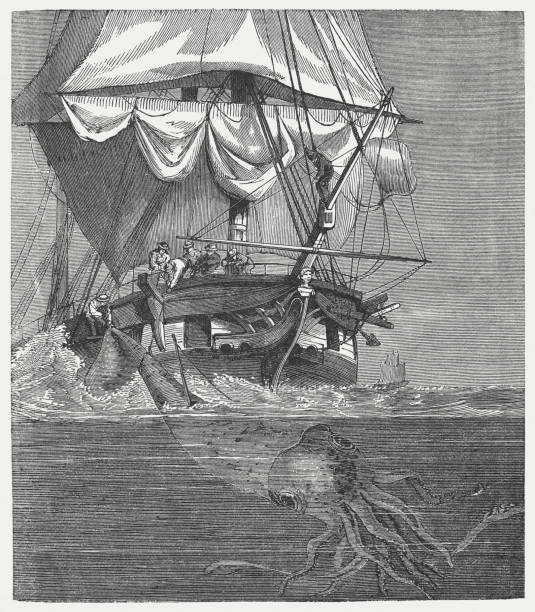
#18 (30/11/1861)
A wood engraving of the Alecton encounter published in 1868, the squid clearly based on the one from the more famous image that had earlier appeared in Figuier (1866)

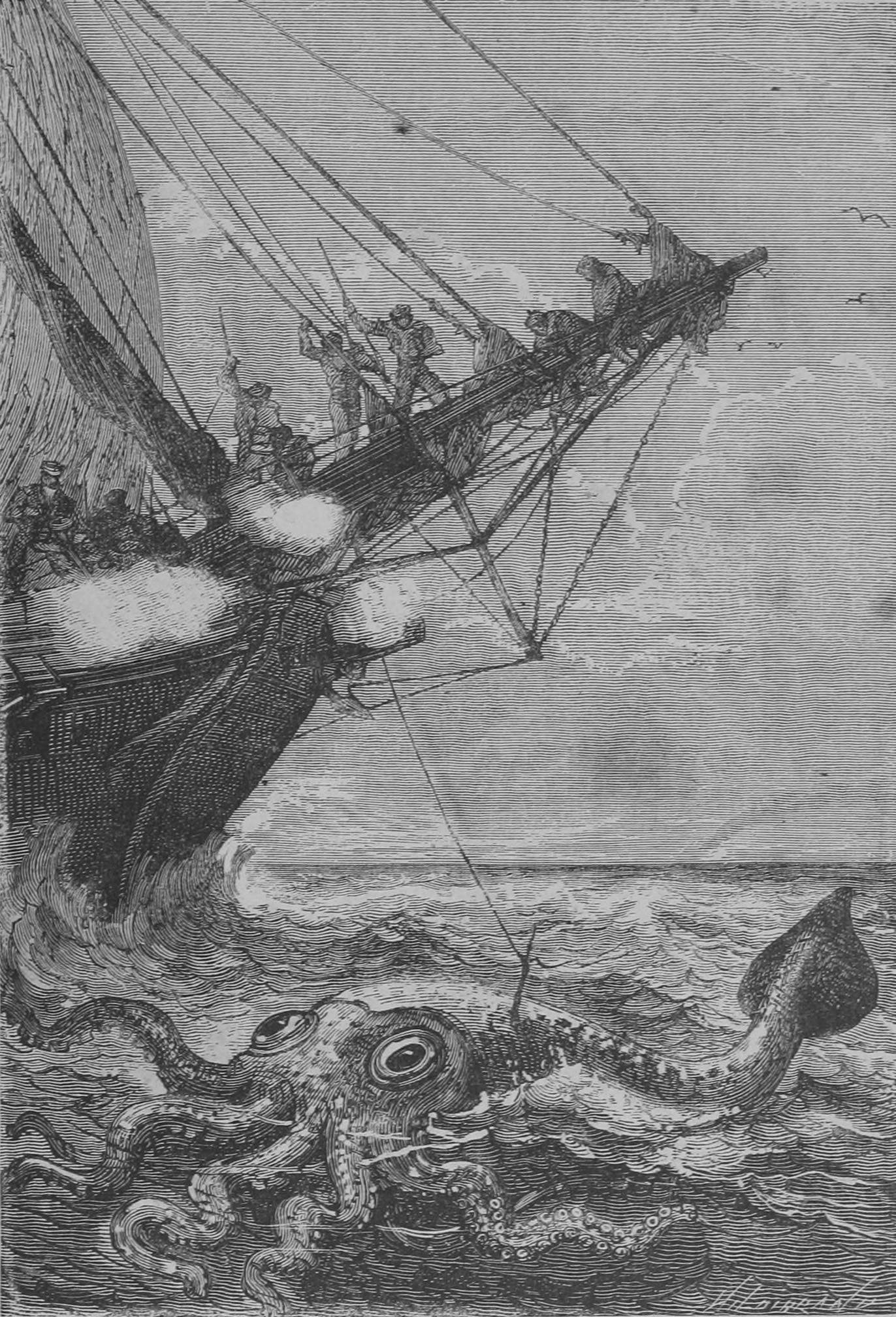
#18 (30/11/1861)
Engraving by Henri Théophile Hildibrand from Twenty Thousand Leagues Under the Seas (1871), whose depiction of the giant squid was undoubtedly inspired by the Alecton encounter. Bernard Heuvelmans's The Kraken and the Colossal Octopus incorrectly described this illustration as "[t]he Alecton squid after Arthur Mangin, 1864".

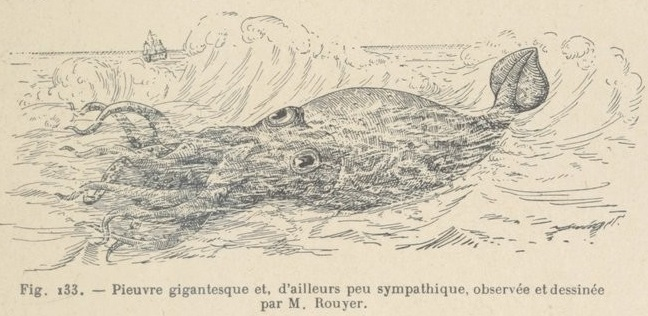
#18 (30/11/1861)
An illustration of the Alecton encounter from Les Animaux Excentriques by Henri Coupin, first published in 1903, based on the original from Bouyer (here given as "Rouyer").

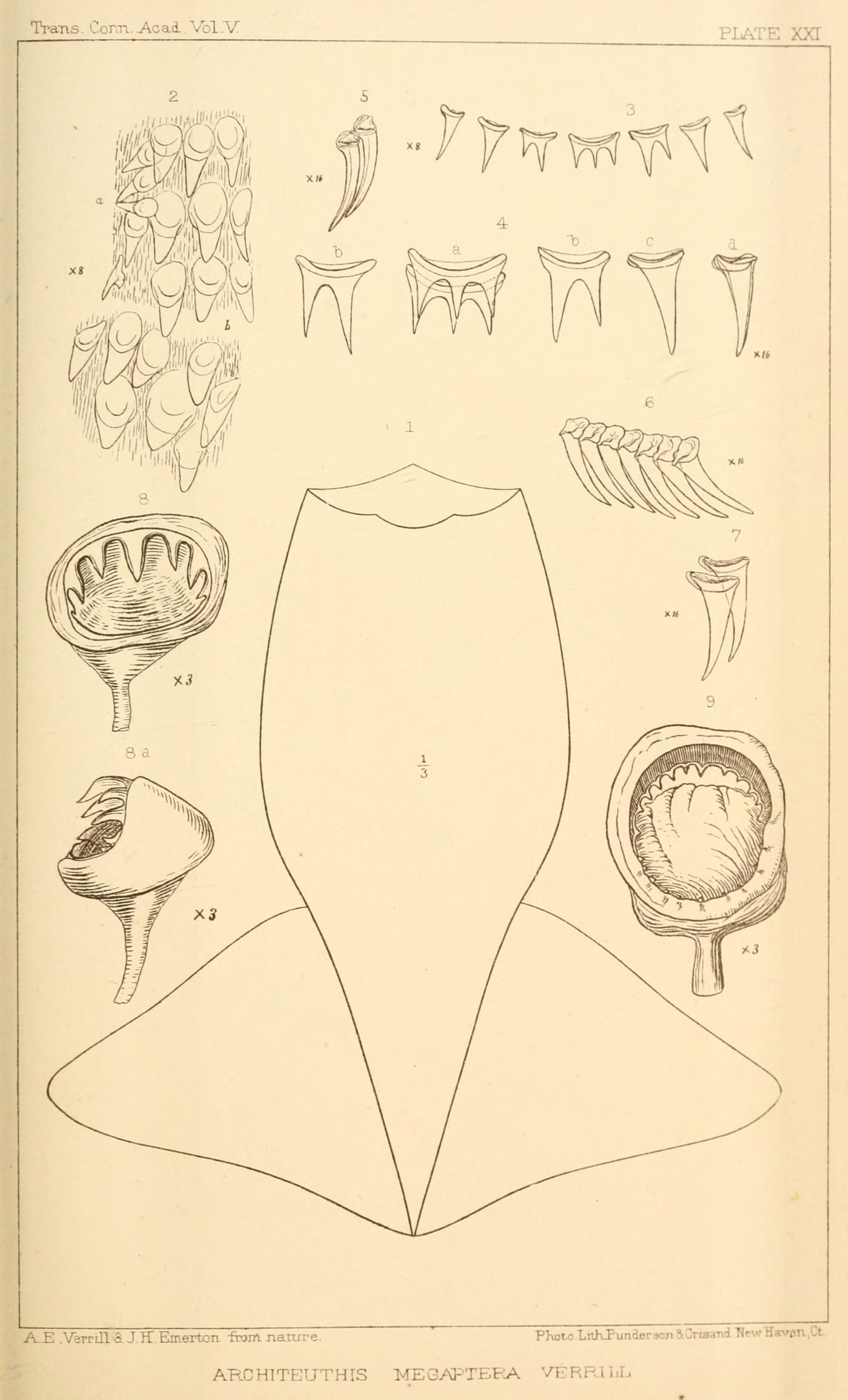
#[1] (1870?)
Anatomical details of the squid that washed ashore in Nova Scotia, Canada, around 1870. It was originally described as Architeuthis megaptera and later identified as Sthenoteuthis pteropus. Shown are the mantle (fig. 1), teeth of the radula and palate (figs. 2–7), and arm and tentacle suckers (figs. 8–9) (Verrill, 1880a:pl. 21).

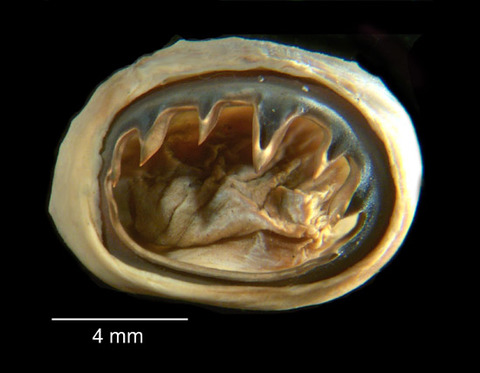
#[1] (1870?)
Preserved sucker (oral view) of the Architeuthis megaptera type specimen from Nova Scotia. Deposited at Yale's Peabody Museum of Natural History.

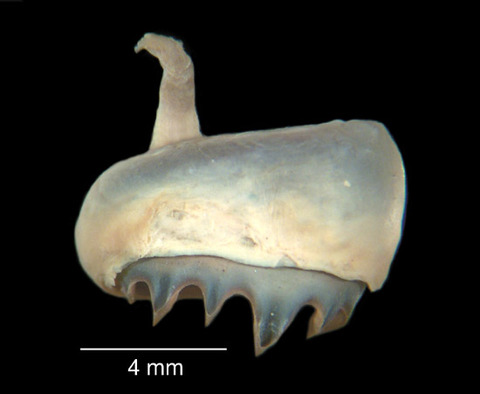
#[1] (1870?)
Sucker of the same specimen in lateral view. Photographed in 2006 at the Peabody Museum of Natural History.

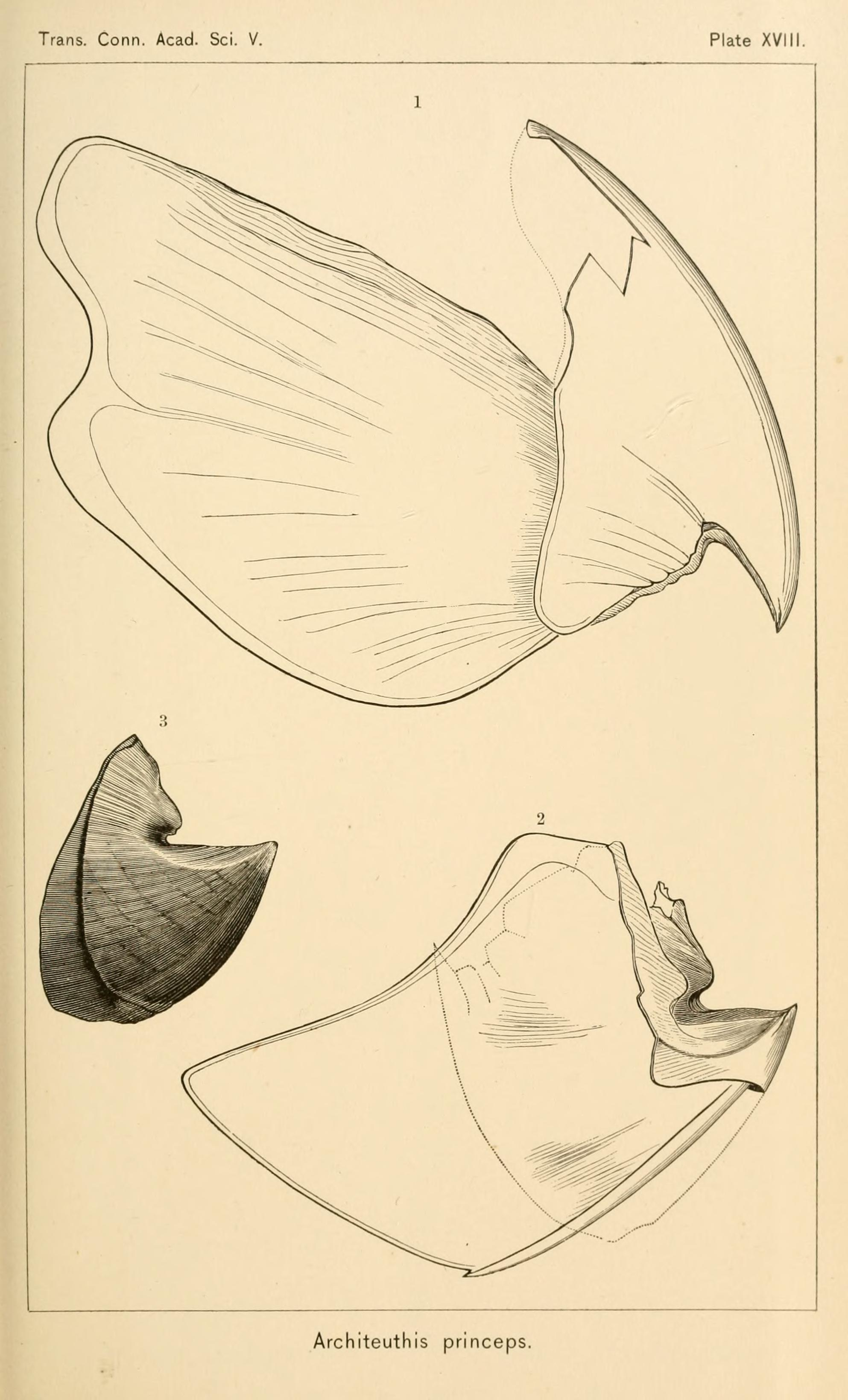
#22 (?/10/1871) and #26 (≤1873)
The two syntypes of Architeuthis princeps: lower beak of Verrill specimen No. 1 from 1871 (#22; left—drawn by J. H. Emerton) and upper and lower beaks of Verrill specimen No. 10 from 1873 or earlier (#26; top and bottom—drawn by A. E. Verrill) (Verrill, 1880a:pl. 18). A front view of the former is additionally shown in Verrill (1882c:pl. 11 fig. 3a).

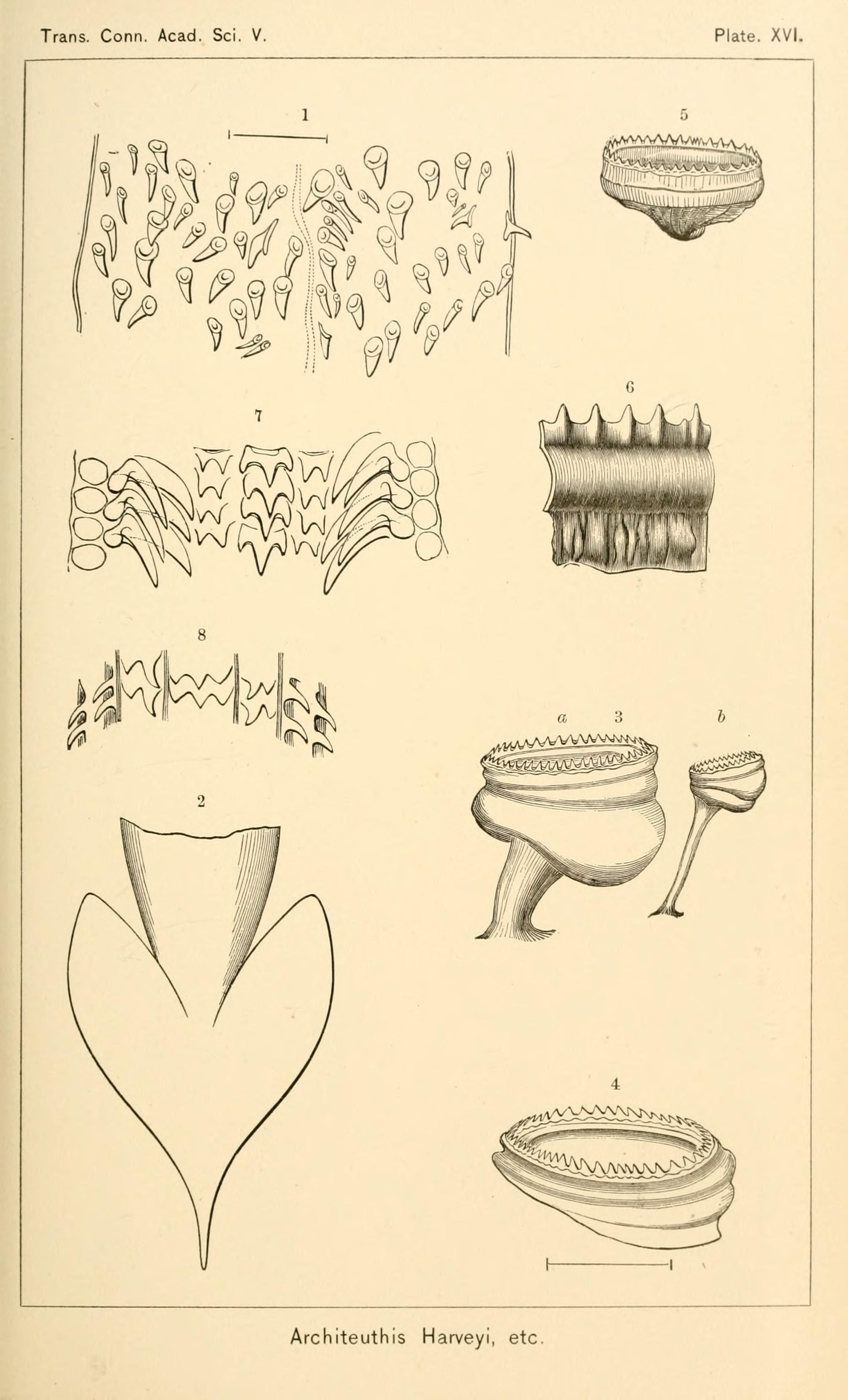
#25 (?/12/1872), #30 (25/11?/1873), and one other
Anatomical details of Verrill specimen No. 4 from 1872 (#25; tentacular sucker and closeup of same: figs. 5–6) and Verrill specimen No. 5 from 1873 (#30; lining membrane of palate: fig. 1; caudal fins: fig. 2; tentacular suckers: fig. 3; arm sucker: fig. 4) (Verrill, 1880a:pl. 16). Also shown are radular teeth of Loligo pallida (synonym of Doryteuthis pealeii; fig. 7) and giant squid specimen #16, redrawn from Harting (1860:pl. 1 fig. 4) (fig. 8).

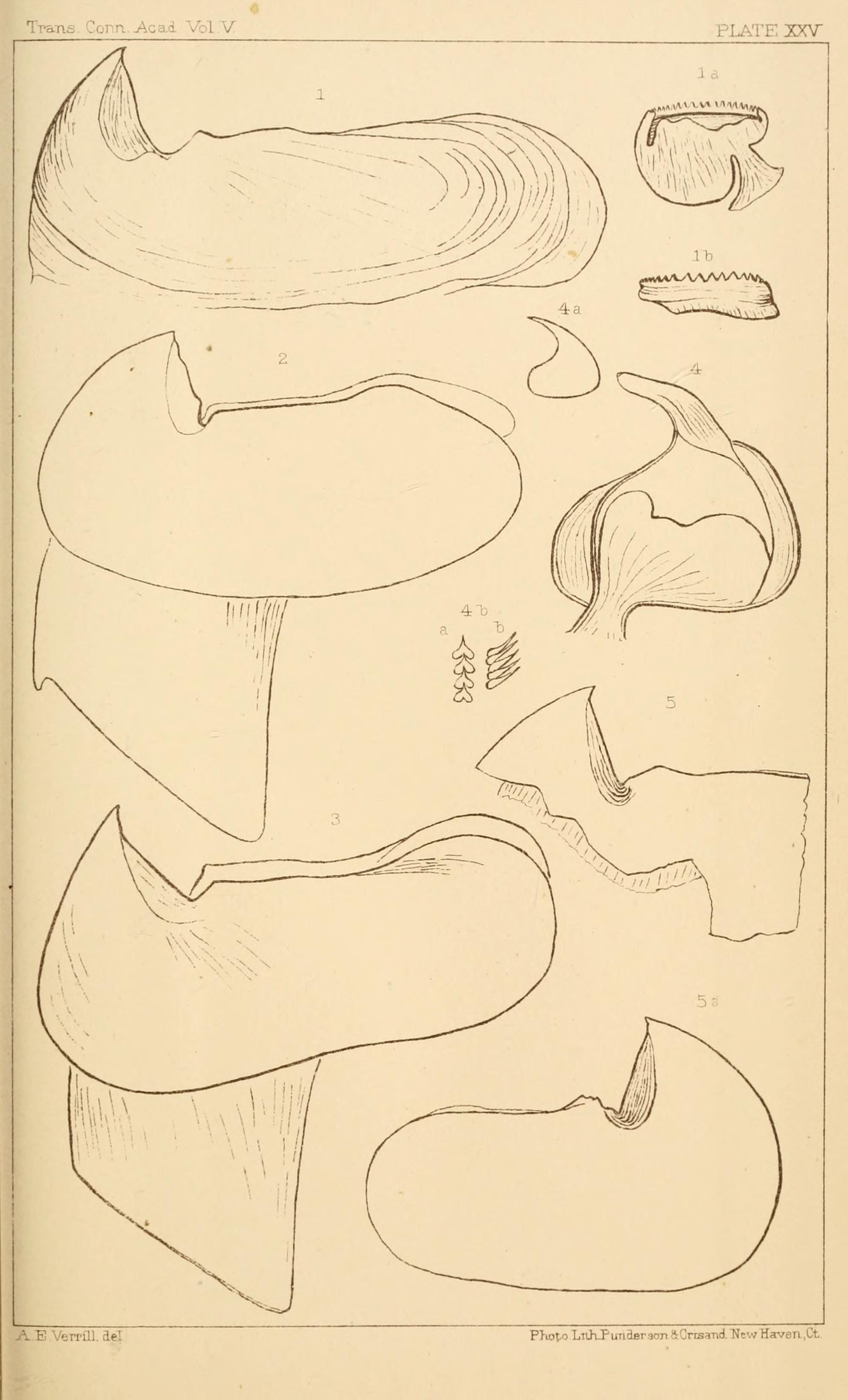
#25 (?/12/1872) and others
Verrill's sketches of the two halves of the lower mandible of specimen No. 4 from 1872 (#25), drawn from photographs (figs. 5–5a), as well as beaks and other remains redrawn from earlier sources: #16 from Harting (1860:pl. 1 figs. 1, 8, 8') (figs. 1–1b); Steenstrup's A. dux from Harting (1860:pl. 1 fig. 1A) (fig. 2); #13 after what was eventually published as Steenstrup (1898:pl. 1 fig. 2) (fig. 3); and "Enoploteuthis hartingii" from Harting (1860:pl. 2 fig. 15, pl. 3 figs. 23–24) (figs. 4–4b) (Verrill, 1880a:pl. 25)

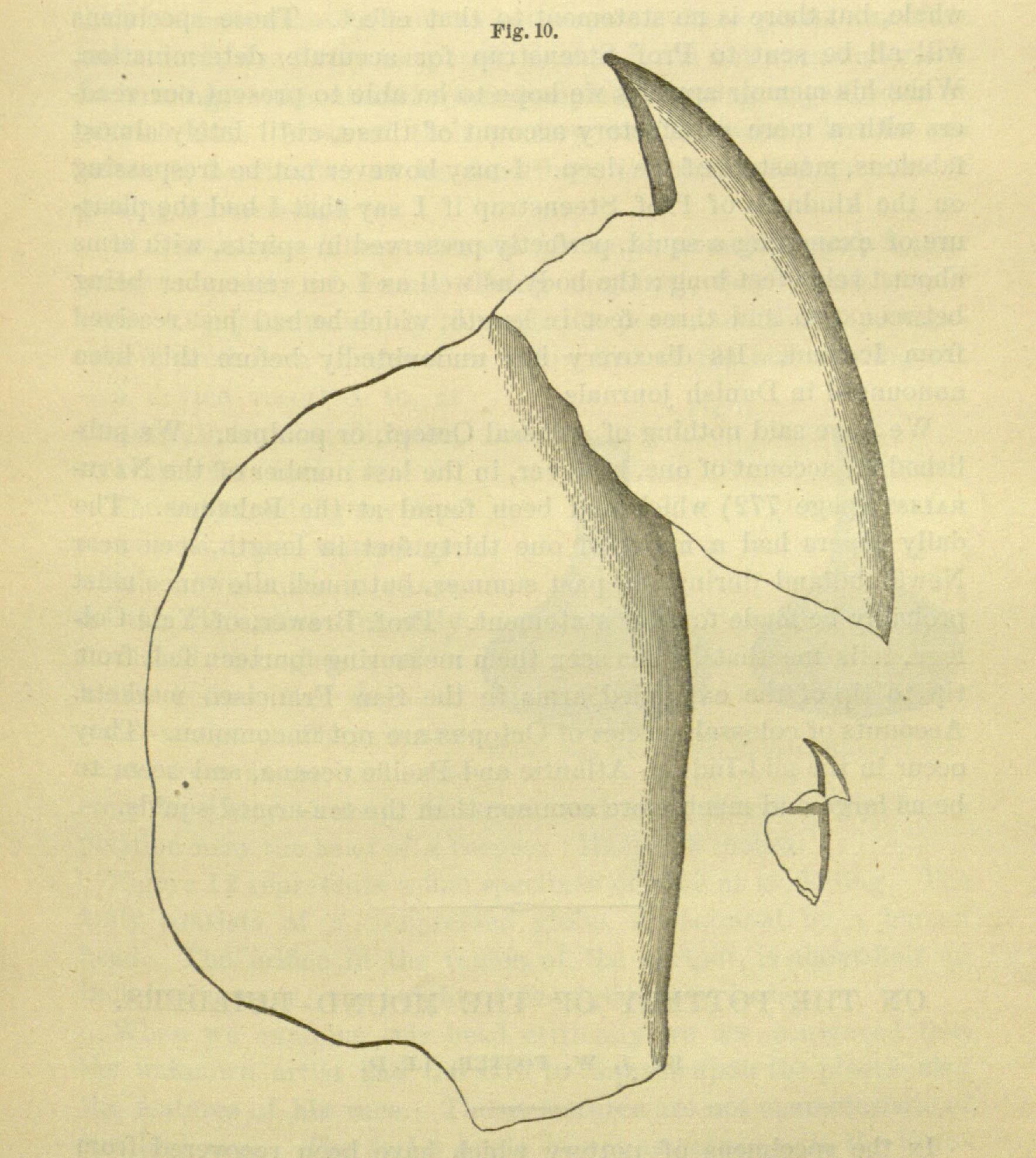
#26 (≤1873)
Upper beak extracted from a sperm whale stomach, from Packard (1873:93, fig. 10). A. E. Verrill considered the illustration inaccurate and published his own version. The much smaller beak (drawn to scale), possibly from the same whale, may belong to Gonatus fabricii, as suggested by Steenstrup.

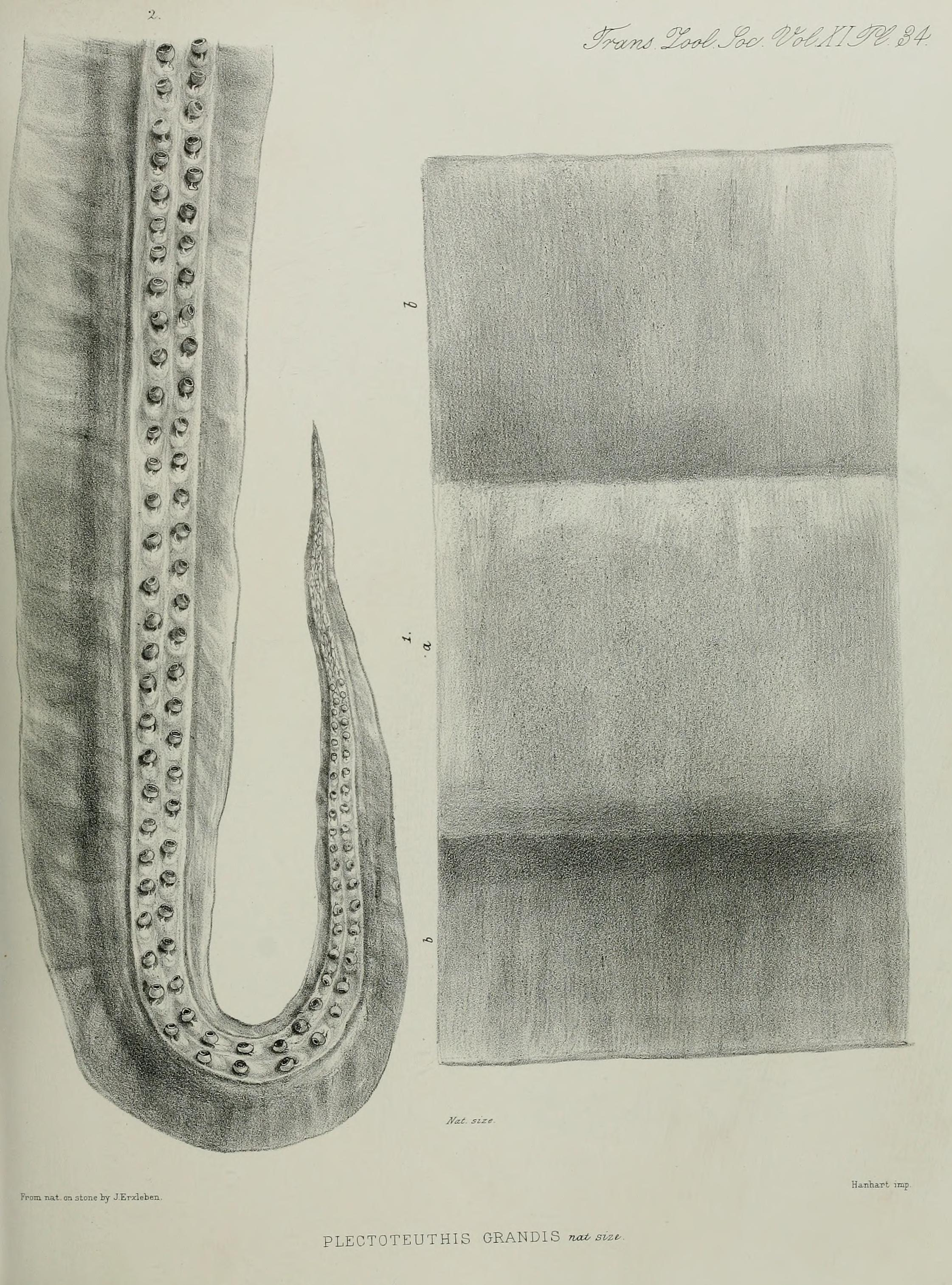
#27 (≤1873)
The type specimen of Plectoteuthis grandis, consisting of a single arm (Owen, 1881:pl. 34). The provenance of this material is uncertain, but it may originate from the east coast of South America.

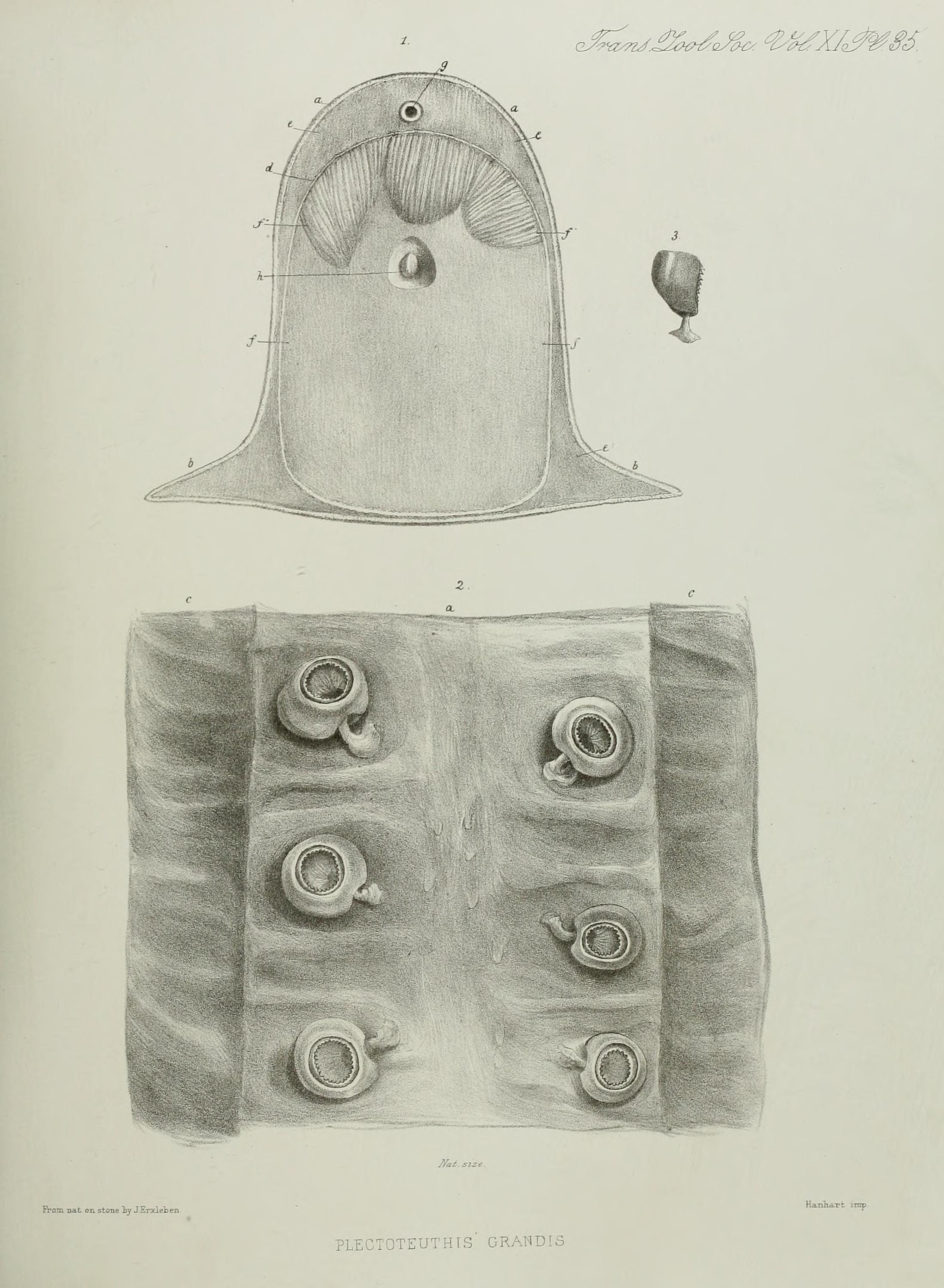
#27 (≤1873)
Closeups and cross-sectional view of the same (Owen, 1881:pl. 35)

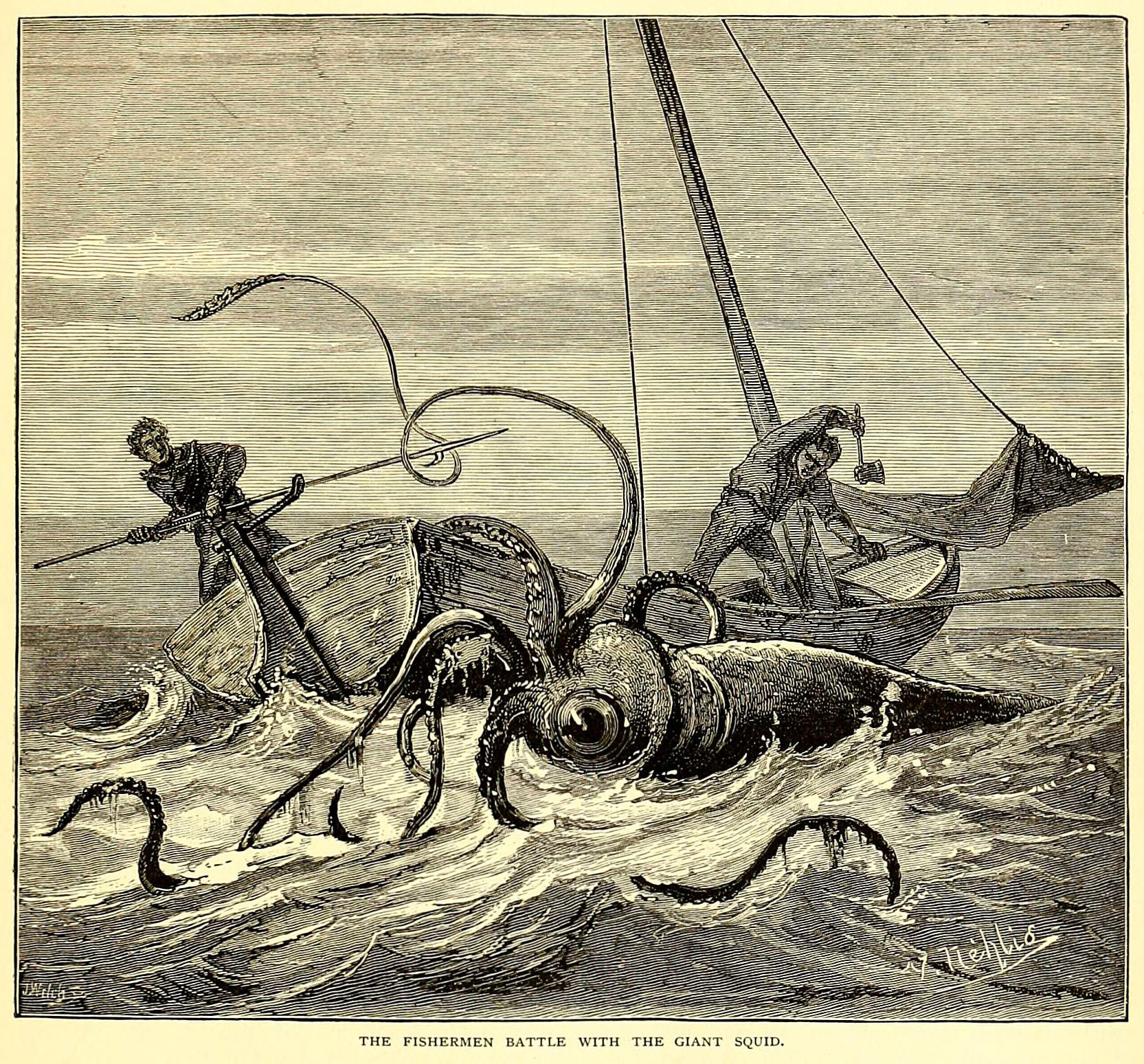
#29 (26/10/1873)
Victor Nehlig's 1881 impression of fisherman Theophilus Picot's encounter with a giant squid off Portugal Cove, Newfoundland, on 26 October 1873 (Rathbun, 1881:267, fig.; compare similar illustration by W. A. Cranston, another by Charles Livingston Bull, and this cover by Quinto Cenni)

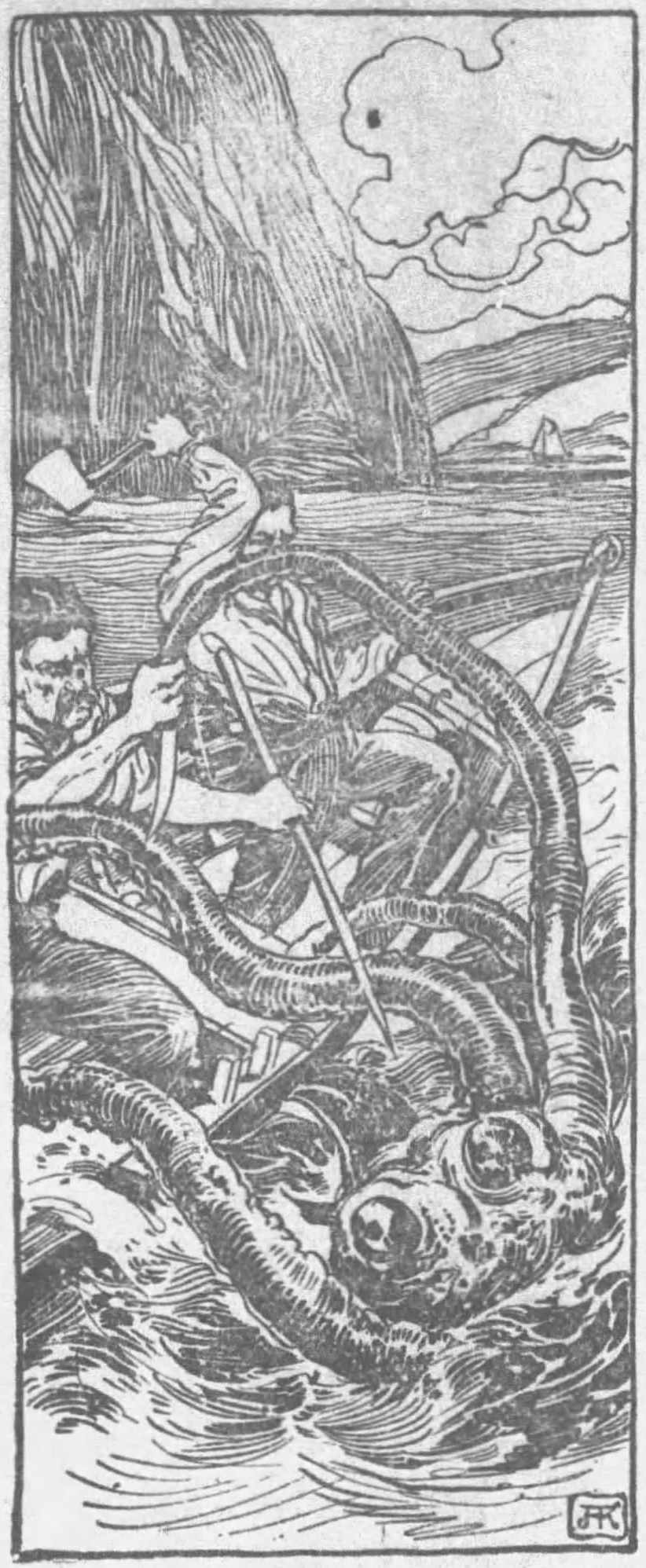
#29 (26/10/1873)
An illustration of the same encounter from the 12 February 1902 issue of The Anniston Hot Blast ([Anon.], 1902b:6, fig.).

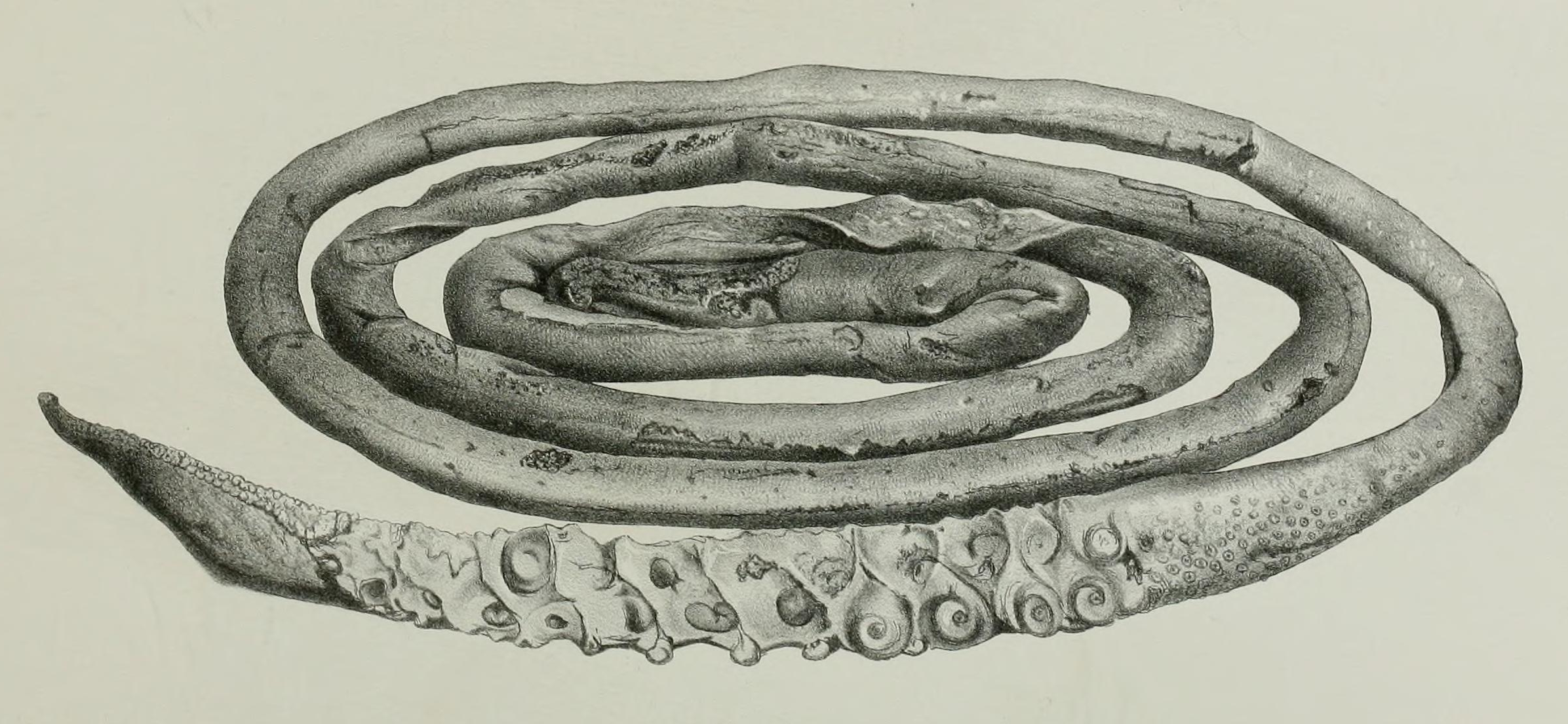
#29 (26/10/1873)
The 19-foot (5.8 m) tentacle of the first Portugal Cove specimen, hacked off a live animal on 26 October 1873 (Owen, 1881:pl. 33 fig. 2; see very similar but horizontally flipped woodcut from Harvey, 1874a:68, fig.)

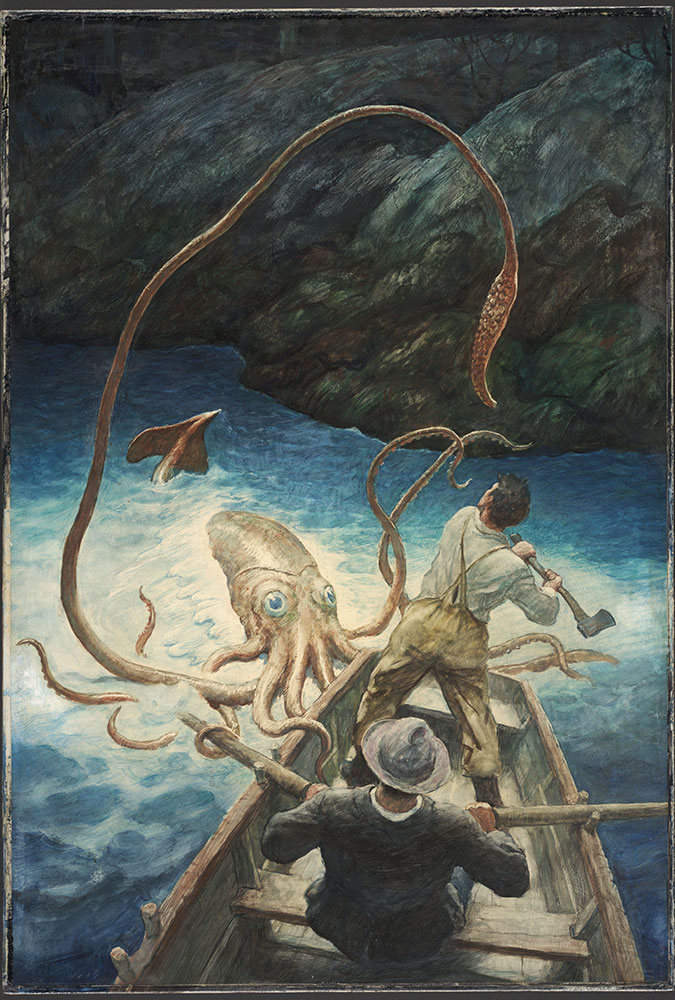
#29 (26/10/1873)
The Adventure of the Giant Squid, painted by N. C. Wyeth c. 1939 to illustrate Norman Duncan's The Adventures of Billy Topsail (1906) as republished in Anthology of Children's Literature (1940). The story includes a fictionalised encounter with a giant squid based on the widely reported first Portugal Cove specimen.

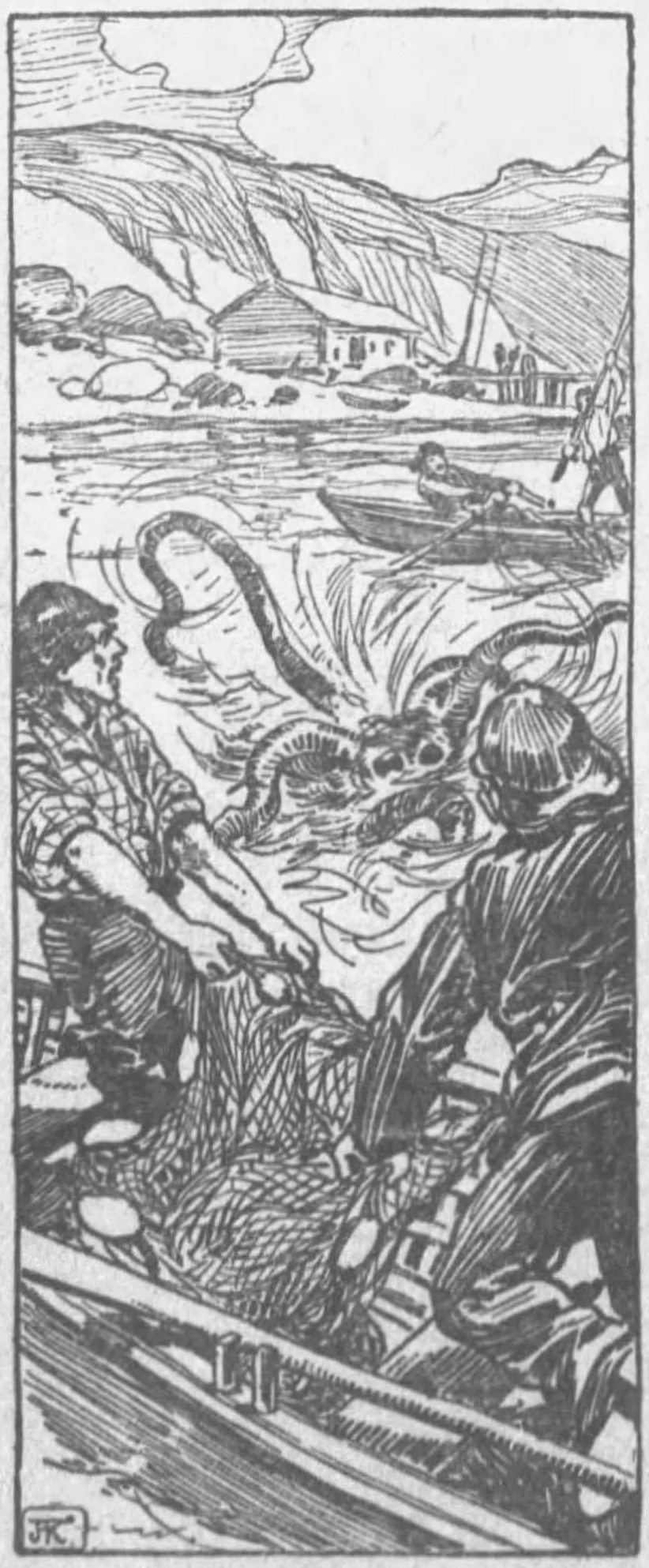
#30 (25/11?/1873)
Artist's depiction of the fishermen's encounter with a giant squid off Logy Bay, Newfoundland, on 25 ?November 1873. Published in The Anniston Hot Blast on 12 February 1902 ([Anon.], 1902b:6, fig.).

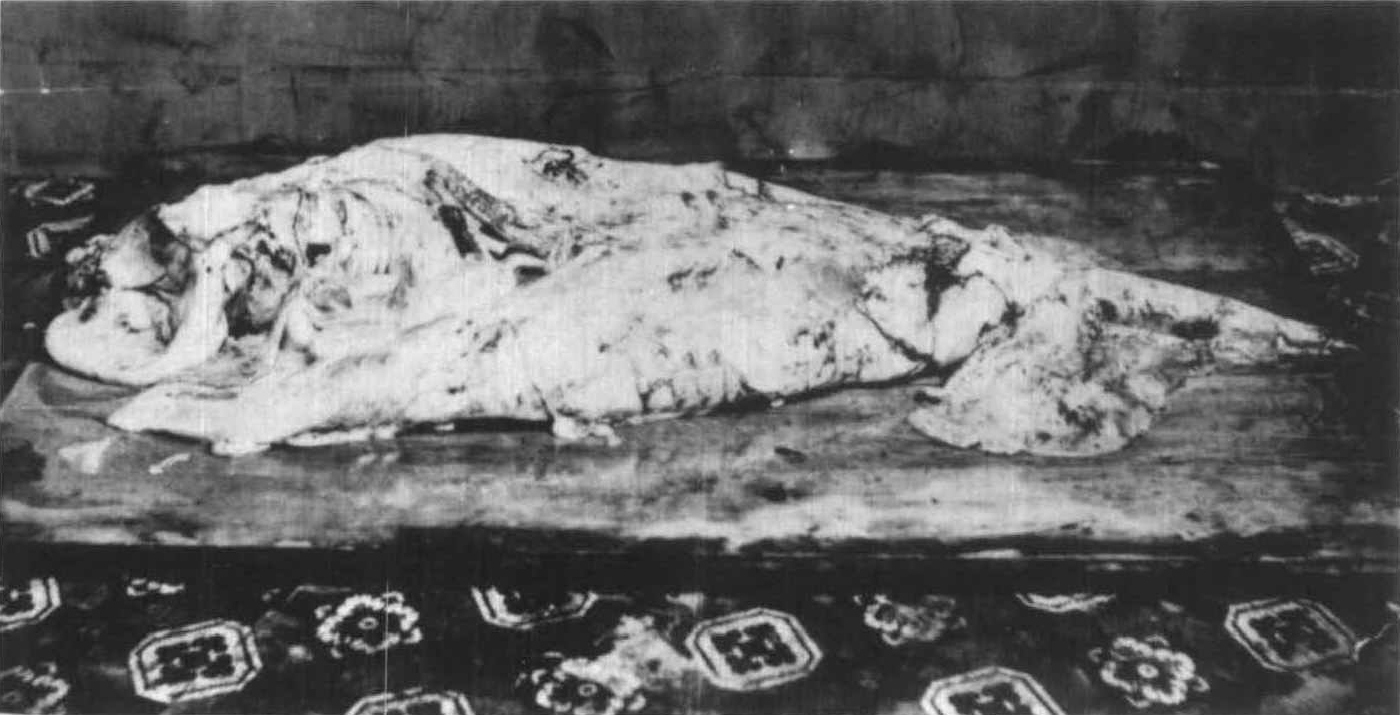
#30 (25/11?/1873)
The mutilated mantle of the specimen from Logy Bay, photographed in Moses Harvey's home (the caudal fin is visible on the right). This original photograph appears not to have been published prior to Aldrich (1991:458, fig. 1B).

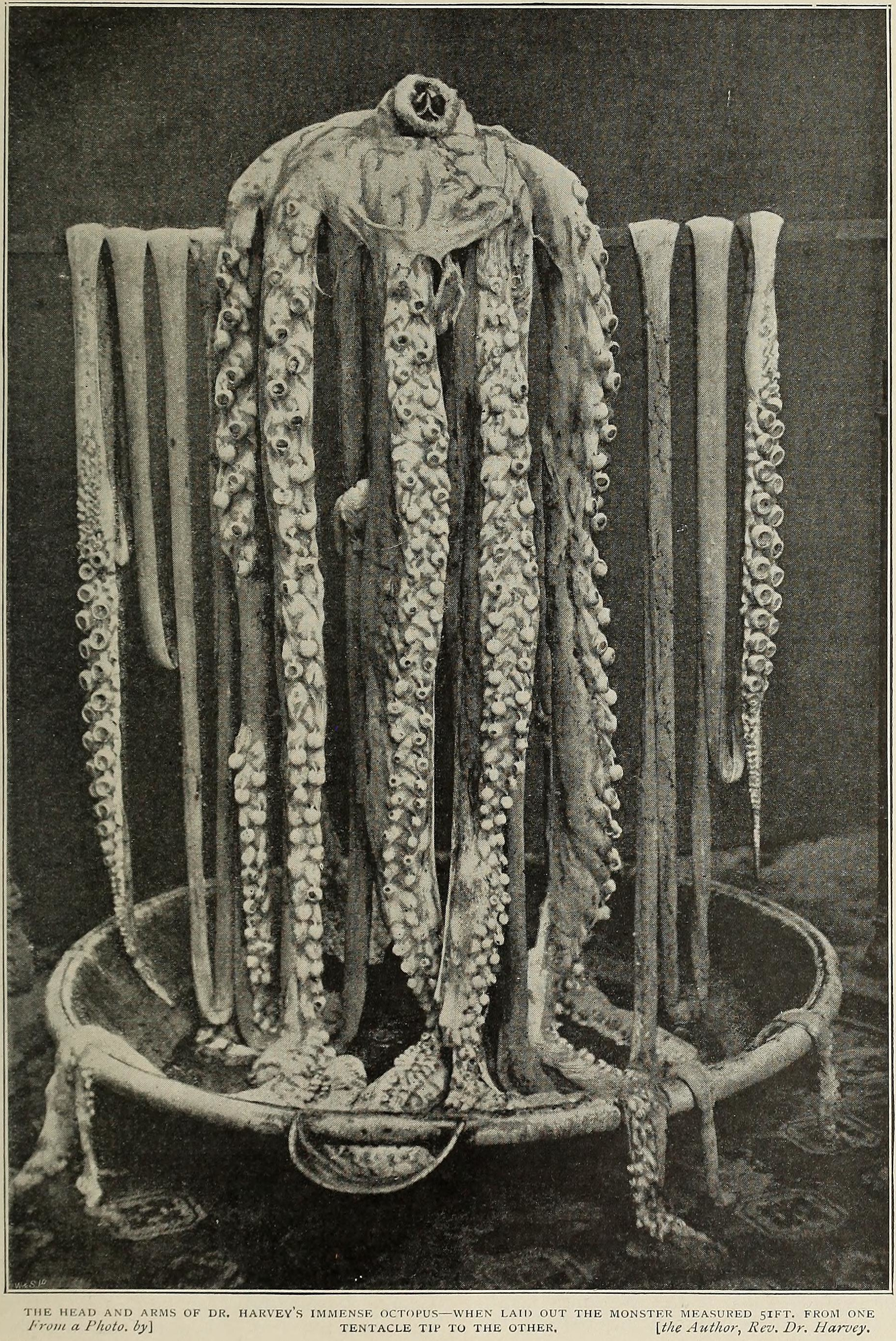
#30 (25/11?/1873)
The Logy Bay giant squid draped over Reverend Moses Harvey's sponge bath, November or December 1873. The original photographs (as opposed to line drawings thereof) were apparently not published until much later; the present one is taken from the April 1899 issue of The Wide World Magazine (Harvey, 1899:737, fig.), where it was captioned "Dr. Harvey's immense octopus [sic]".

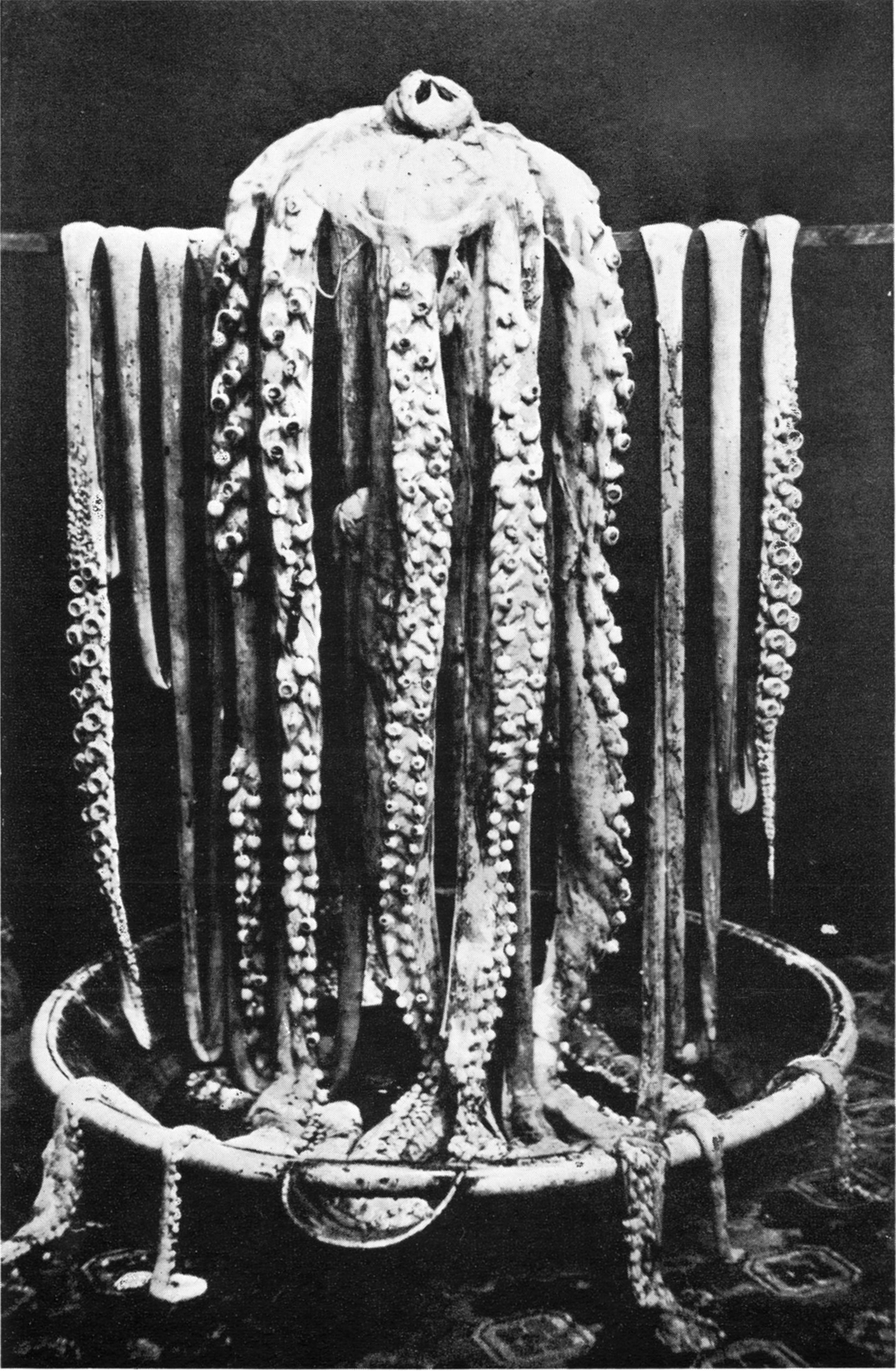
#30 (25/11?/1873)
Another very similar (though non-identical) photograph of the head and arms of the Logy Bay giant squid. This one appeared in Frank Walter Lane's Kingdom of the Octopus (Lane, 1957:pl. 44), where it was described as "the best-known photograph of a giant squid".

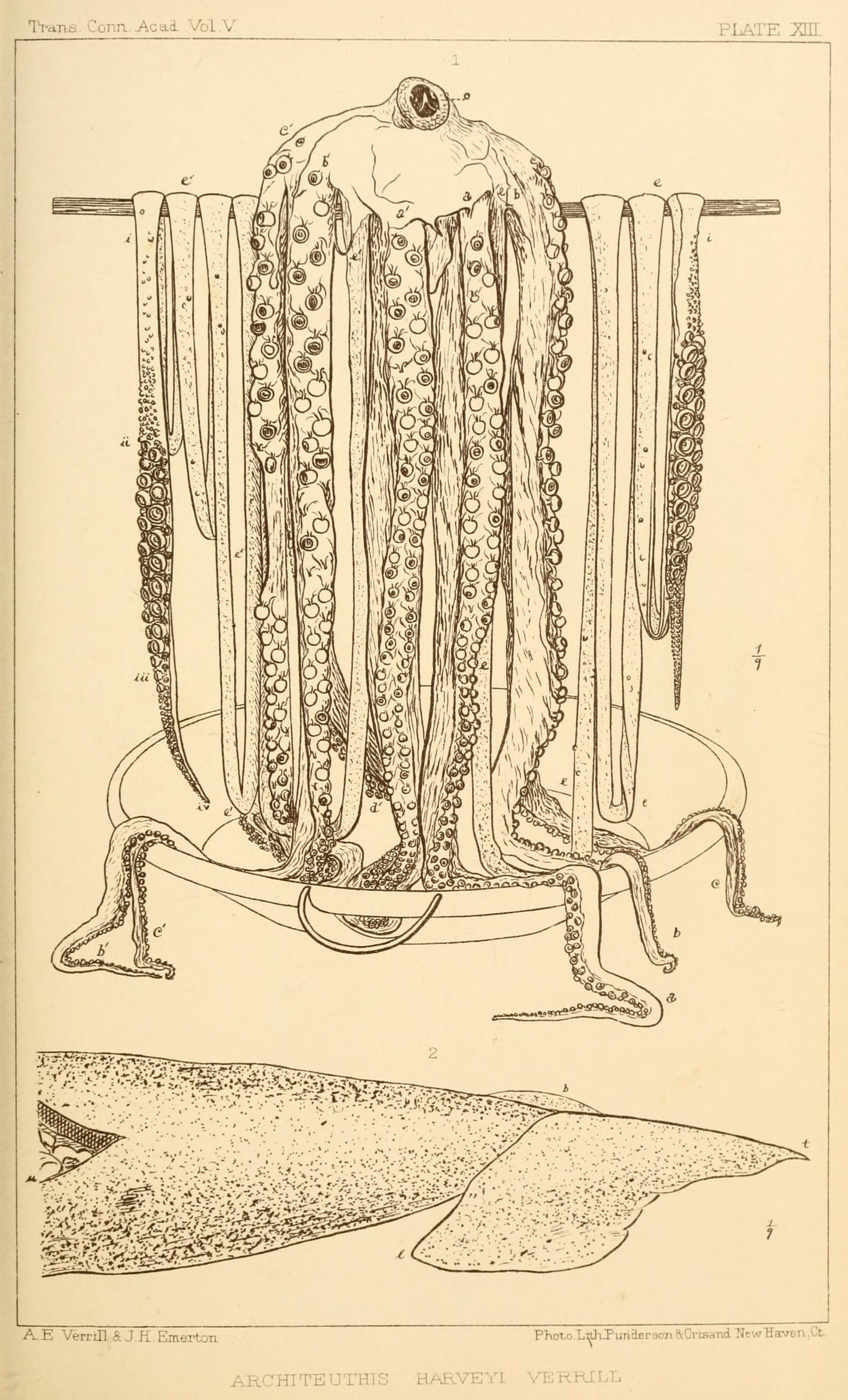
#30 (25/11?/1873)
Line drawings taken from two photographs of the Logy Bay specimen (Verrill, 1880a:pl. 13). Note that the upper illustration is based on a slightly different frame to the preceding photo (as evidenced by the contrasting arrangement of arm tips on the lower left, which are closer to those seen in this version).

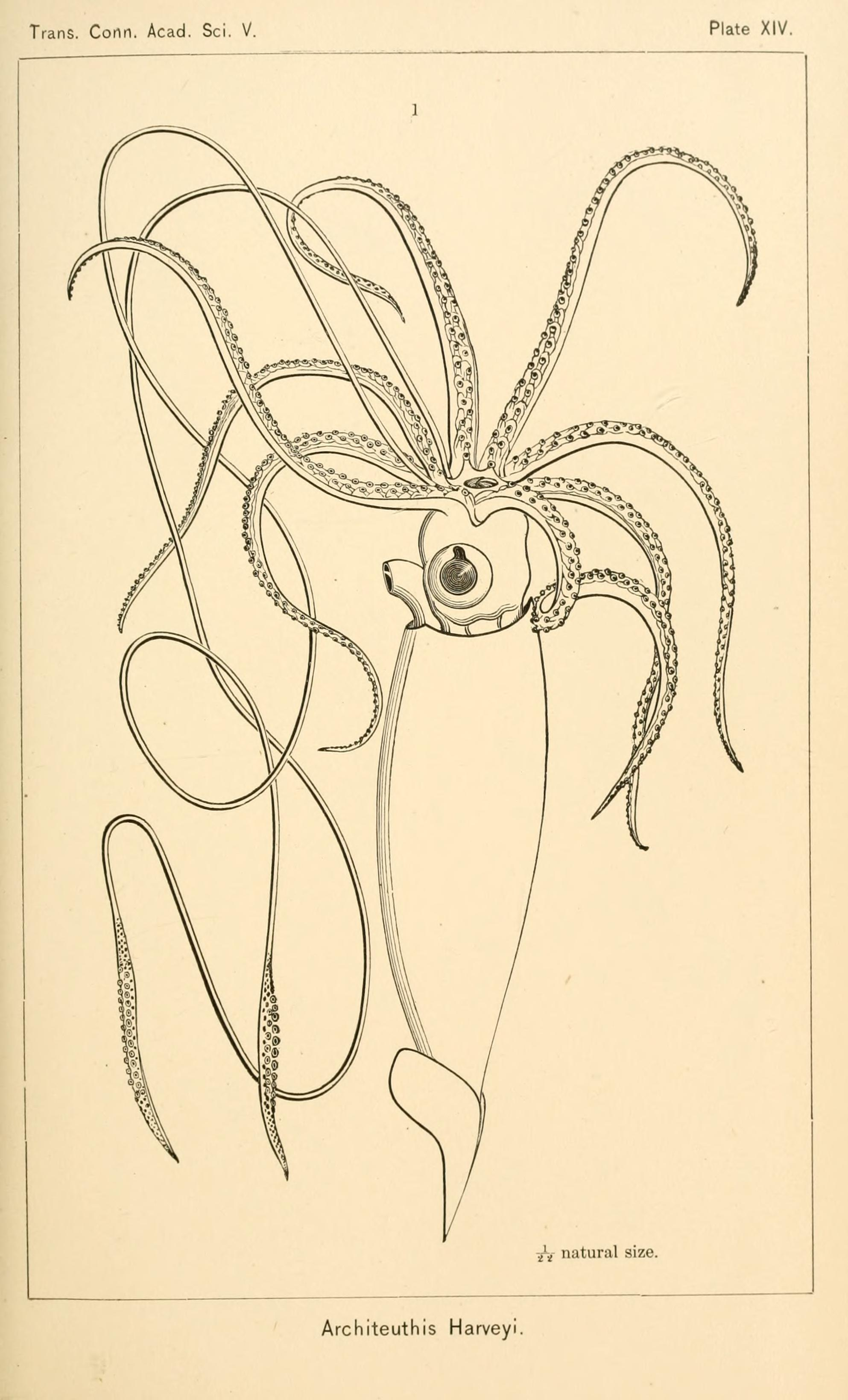
#30 (25/11?/1873)
A. E. Verrill's reconstruction of "Architeuthis Harveyi", the Logy Bay giant squid (Verrill, 1880a:pl. 14)

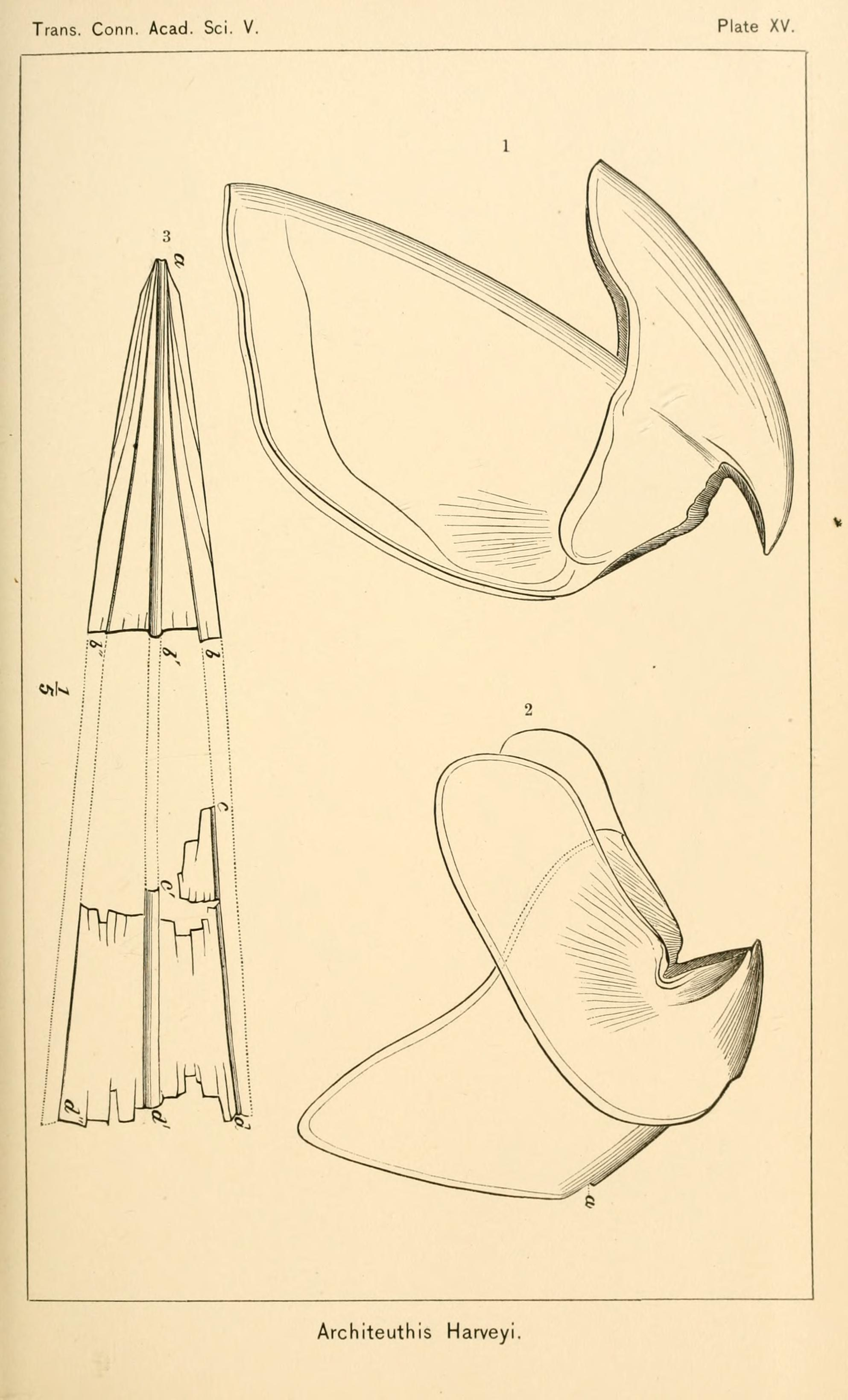
#30 (25/11?/1873)
Two-part beak and gladius fragments of the Logy Bay specimen (Verrill, 1880a:pl. 15)

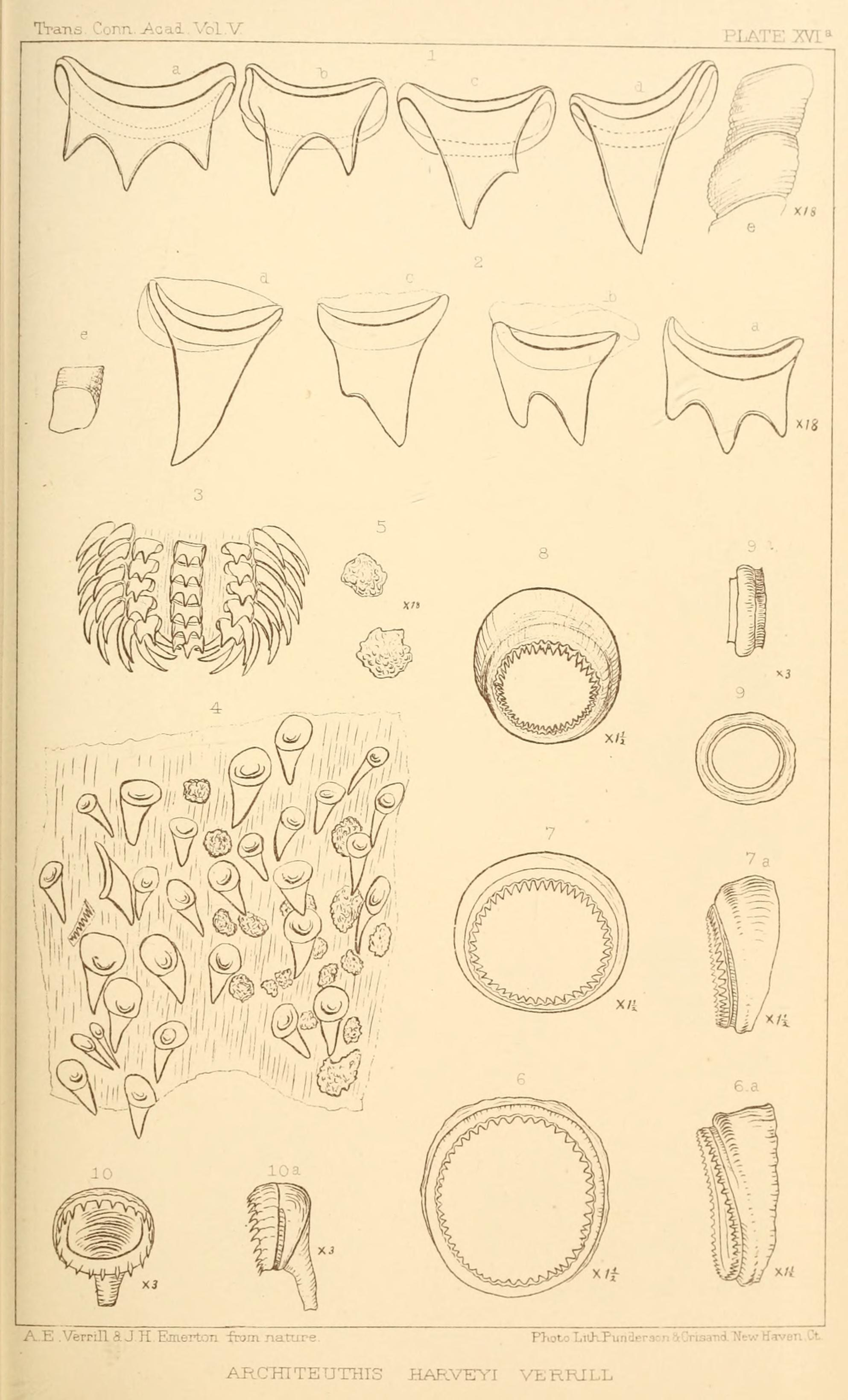
#30 (25/11?/1873)
Suckers of the arms and tentacles and closeups of the radula and its associated teeth (Verrill, 1880a:pl. 16a)

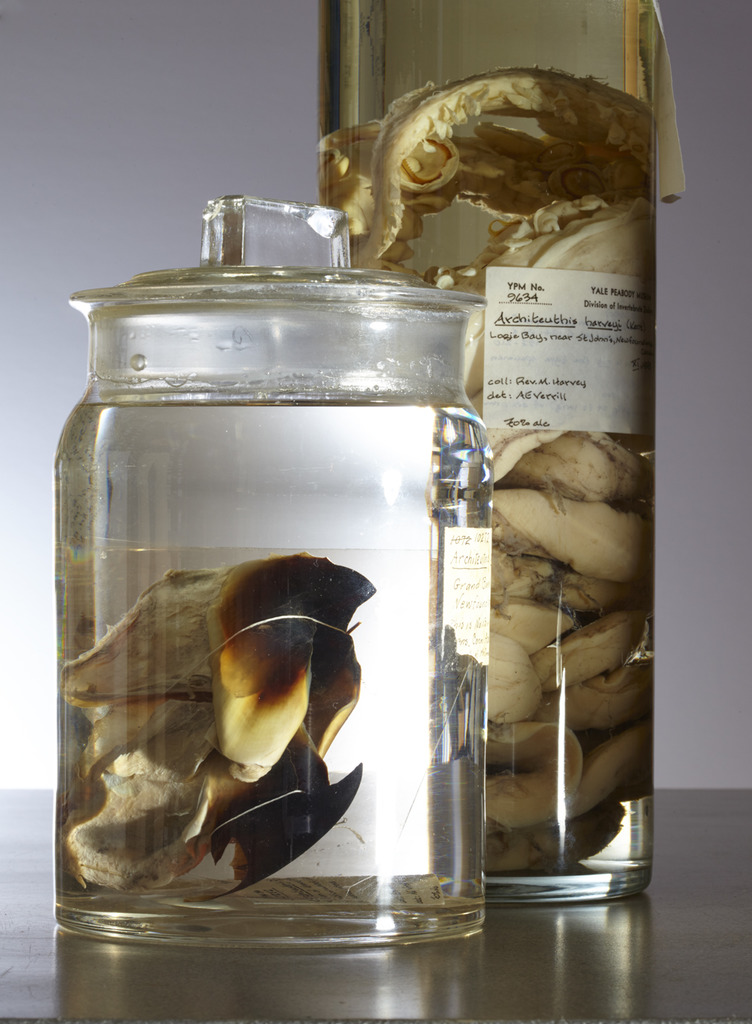
#30 (25/11?/1873)
Extant remains of the Logy Bay specimen (preserved in 70% alcohol) as they appeared in 2015, at Yale's Peabody Museum of Natural History.

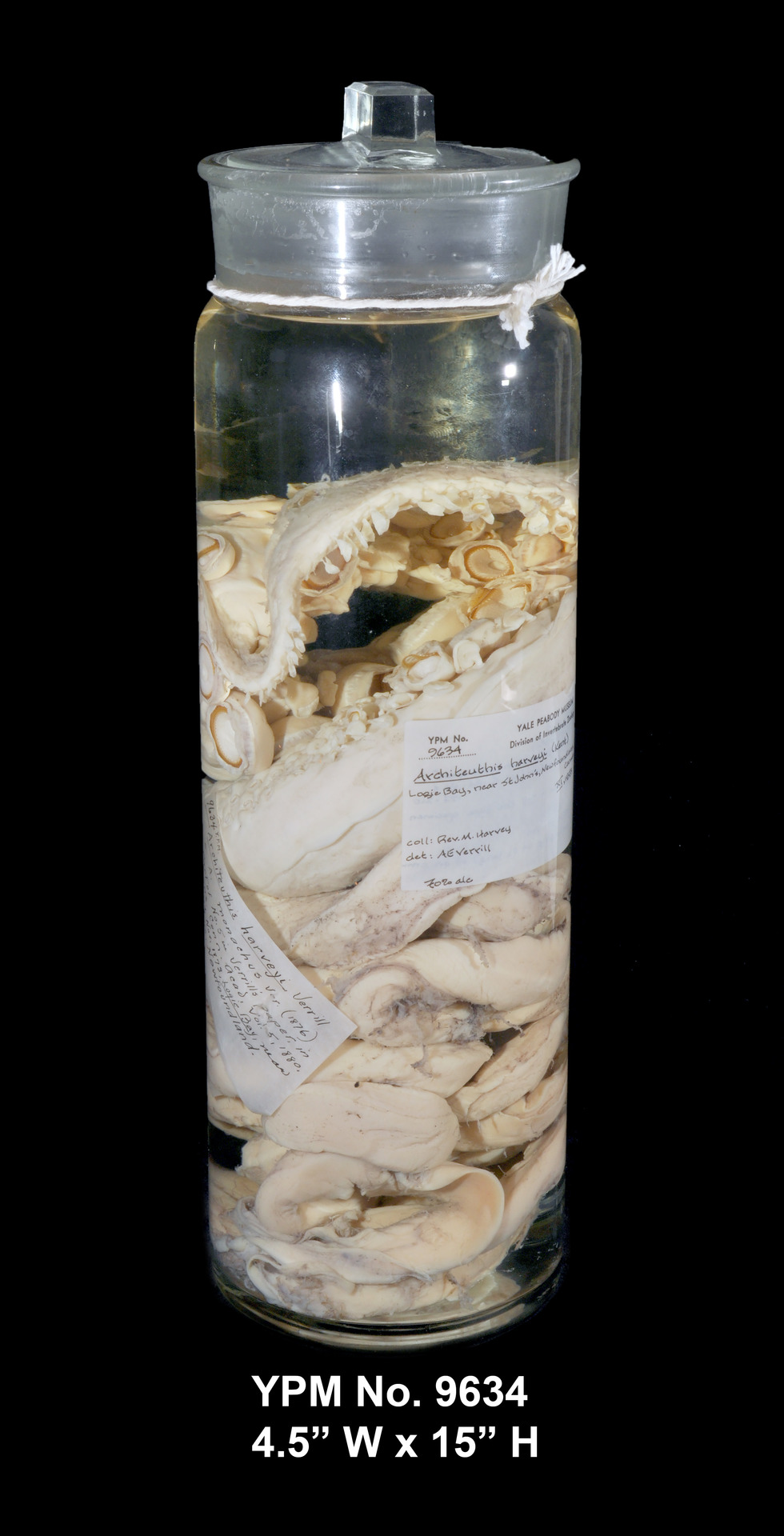
#30 (25/11?/1873)
Limbs of the Logy Bay specimen in 2015, at the Peabody Museum of Natural History.

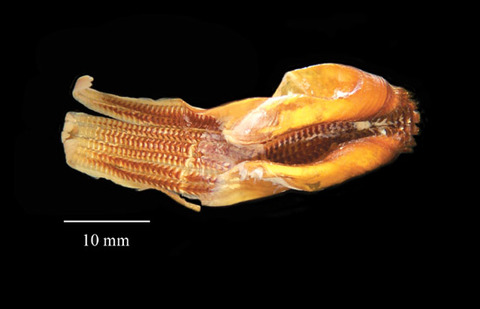
#30 (25/11?/1873)
Radula as it appeared in 2006, at the Peabody Museum of Natural History (see also reverse side).

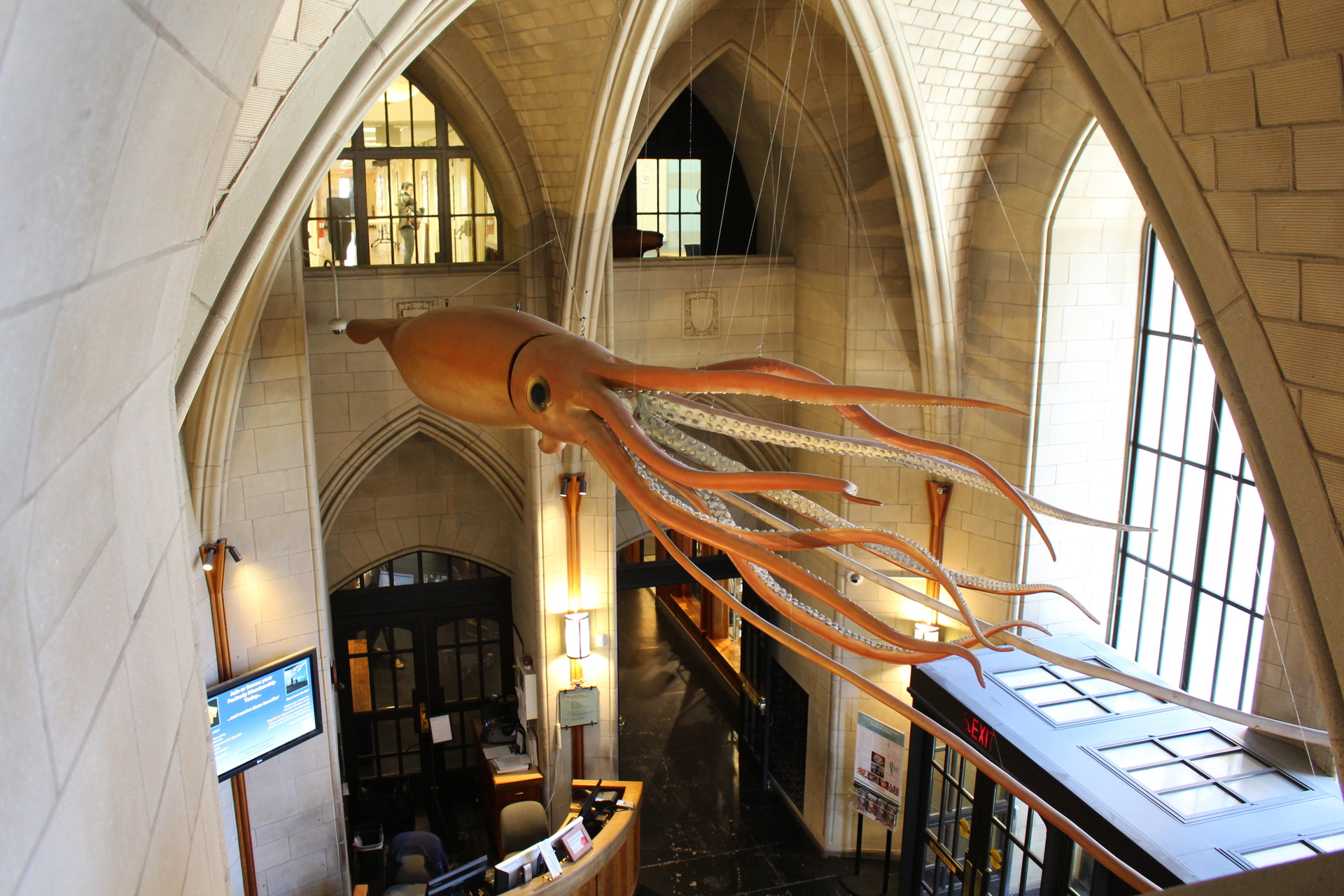
#30 (25/11?/1873)
Model at the Peabody Museum of Natural History, partly based on the Logy Bay specimen. It was built in 1966 to replace the museum's original giant squid model, which was made by J. H. Emerton under the direction of A. E. Verrill in 1883 and was the world's first.

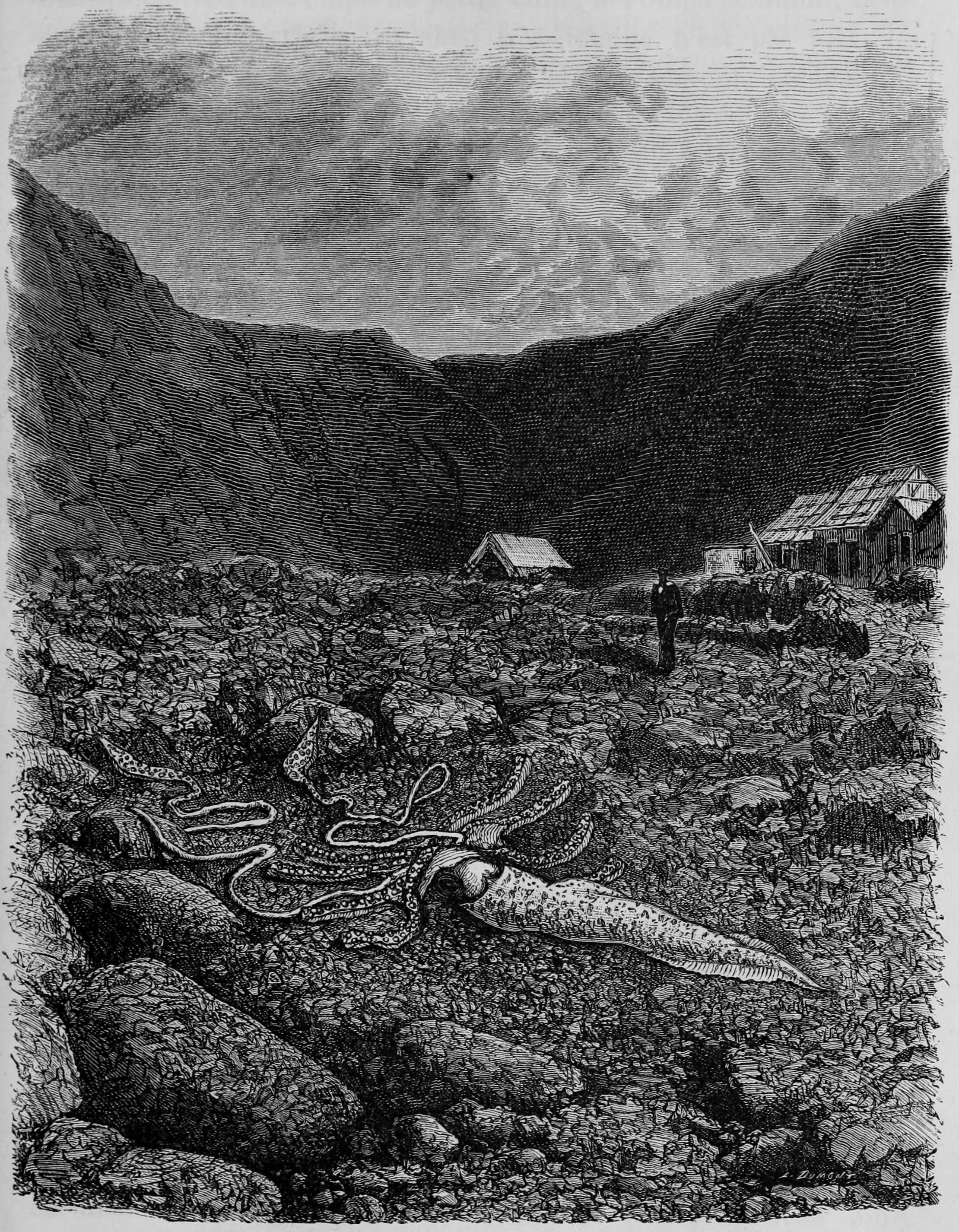
#33 (2/11/1874)
The "calmar gigantesque" that washed ashore on Île Saint-Paul on 2 November 1874, as documented by geologist Charles Vélain during a French astronomical mission to Île Saint-Paul to observe the transit of Venus (Vélain, 1877:81, fig. 8). The illustration is based on a photograph, one of the first ever taken of a giant squid.

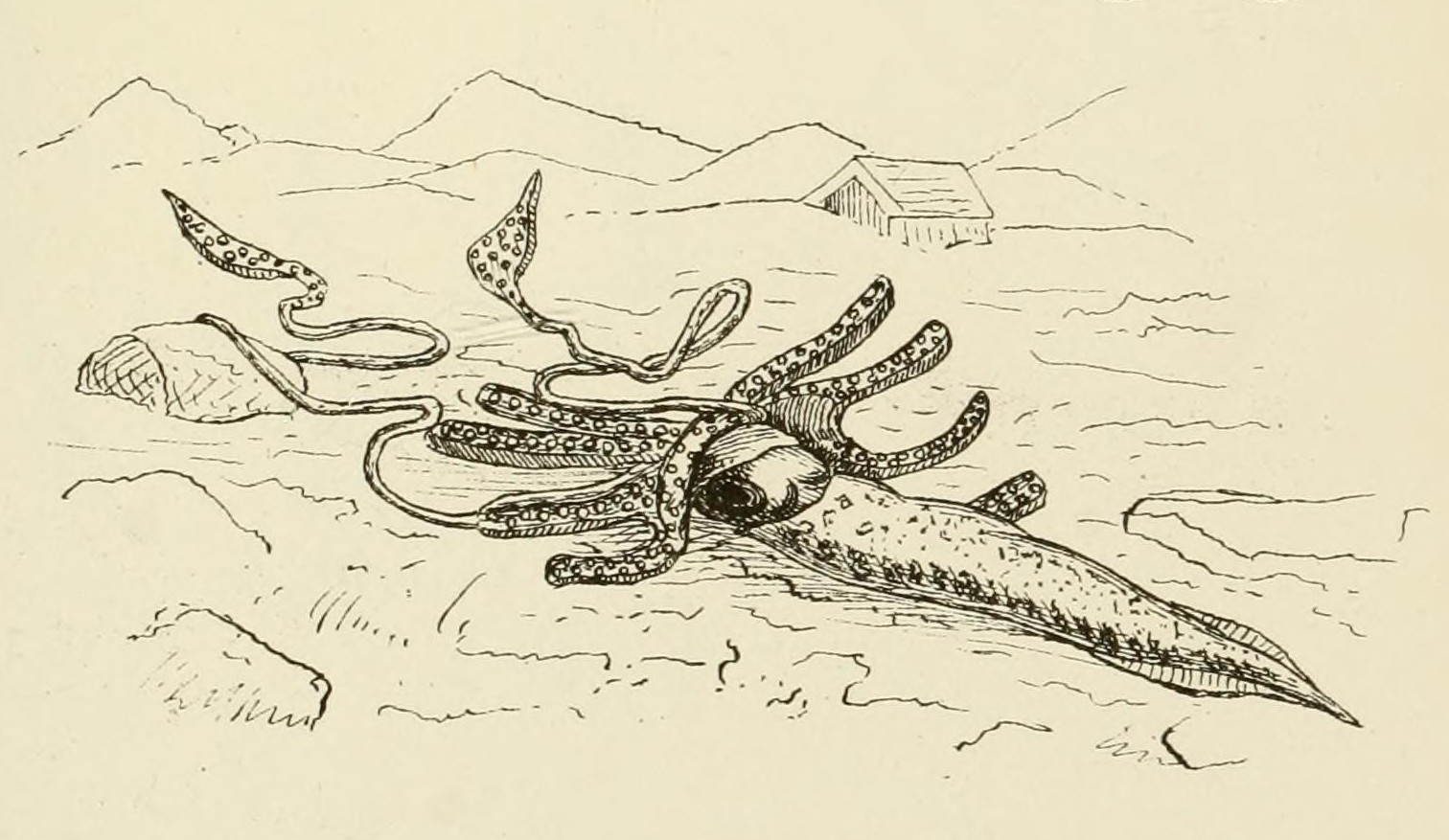
#33 (2/11/1874)
Simplified illustration from George Tryon's Manual of Conchology (Tryon, 1879b:pl. 82 fig. 378), highlighting the strange morphology, on which Tryon opined: "The truncated arms and the gradually attenuating body, with very narrow fins extending along each side for half its length, are noticeable peculiarities, as is also the web connecting the arms; it is questionable, however, how much the engraving may be relied upon".

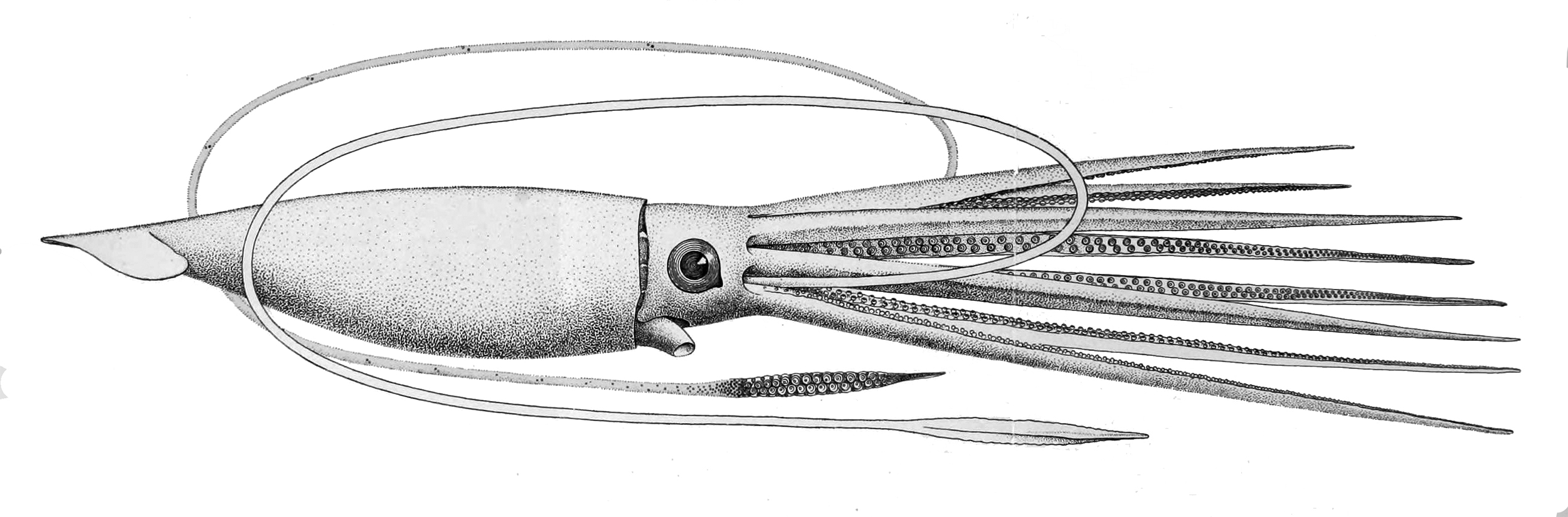
#34 (?/12/1874)
J. H. Emerton's reconstruction of Architeuthis princeps, based chiefly on the Fortune Bay specimen, also known as Verrill specimen No. 13 (Verrill, 1881b:pl. 54 fig. 1). Identified as a drawing of the Catalina specimen (#42) in Richard Ellis's The Search for the Giant Squid.

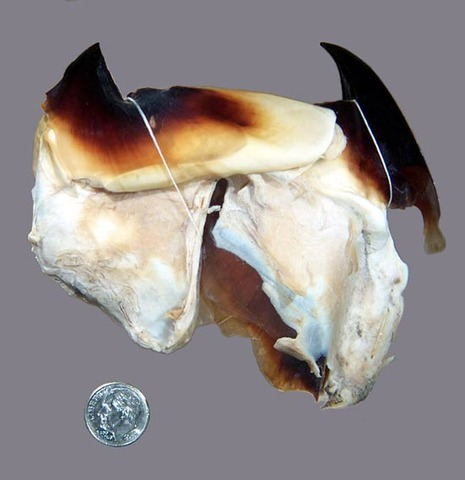
#34 (?/12/1874)
Beak of the Fortune Bay specimen (preserved in 70% alcohol) as it appeared in 2007. Deposited at the Peabody Museum of Natural History.

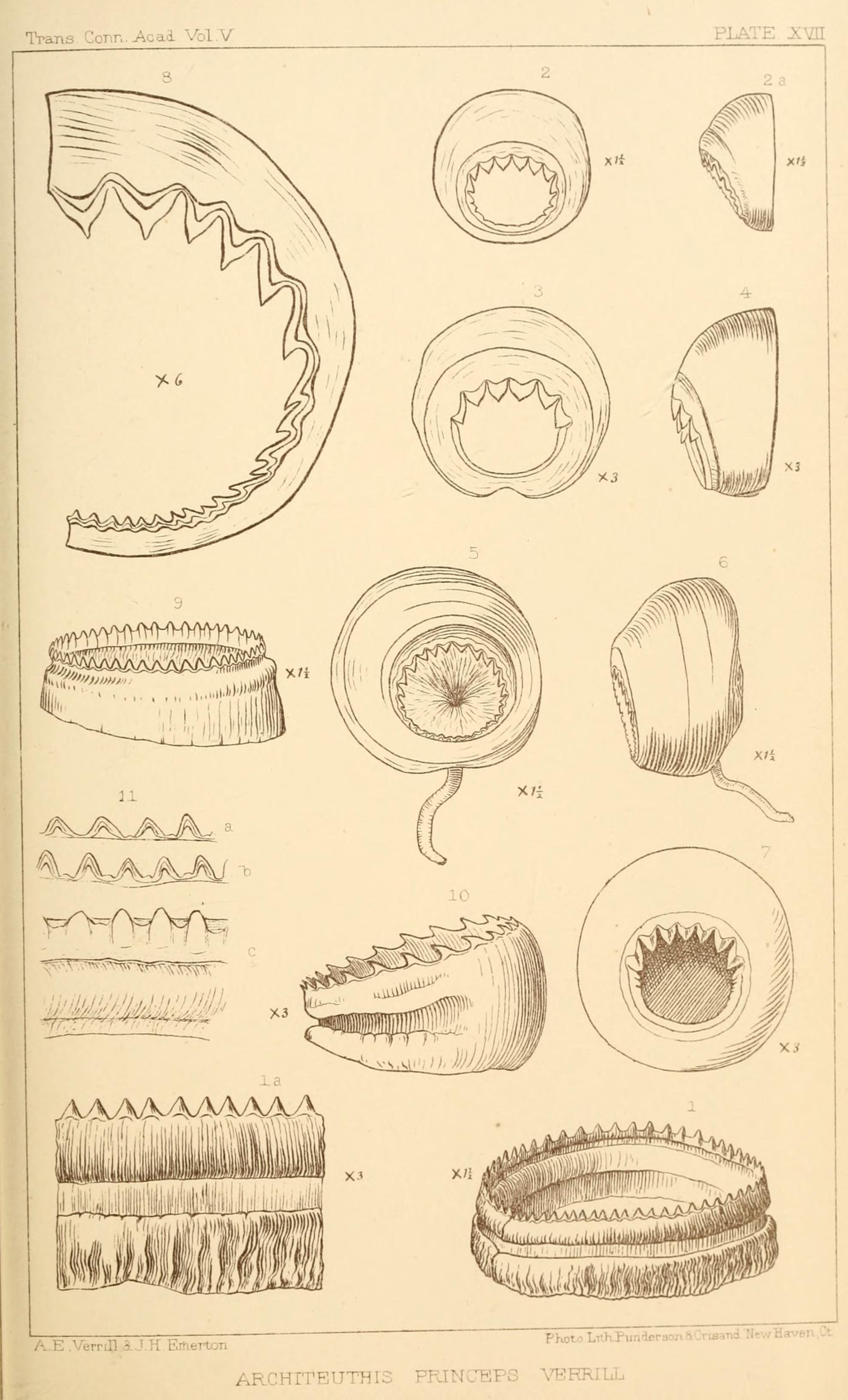
#34 (?/12/1874) and #42 (24/9/1877)
Details of the horny ring of a large tentacular sucker of Verrill specimen No. 13 from 1874 (#34; fig. 11) and assorted arm and tentacular suckers of Verrill specimen No. 14 from 1877 (#42; remaining figures) (Verrill, 1880a:pl. 17)

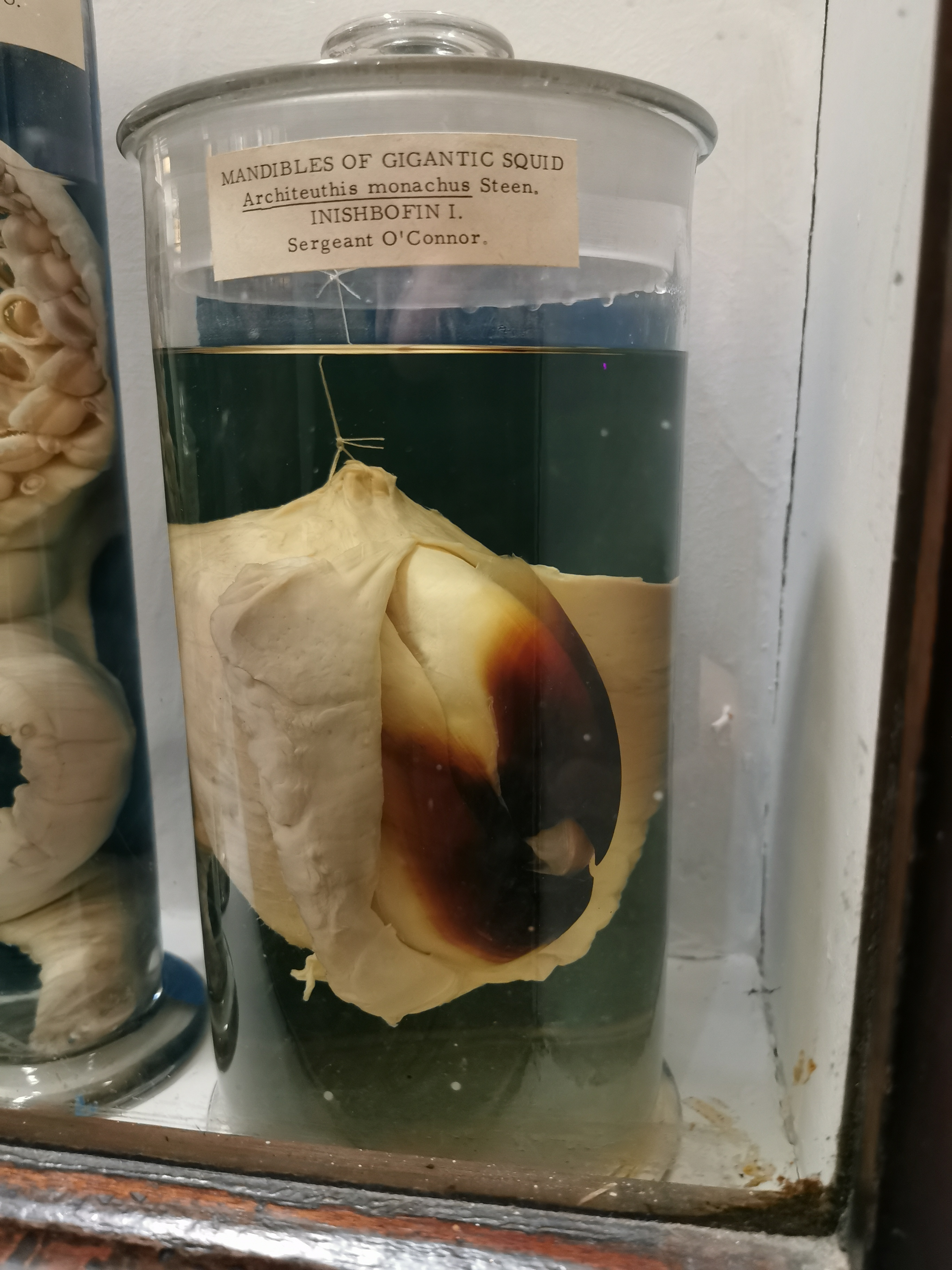
#37 (25/4/1875)
Beak and buccal mass of giant squid caught on 25 April 1875, off Inishbofin, Connemara, Ireland, as it appeared at the National Museum of Ireland – Natural History in 2019.

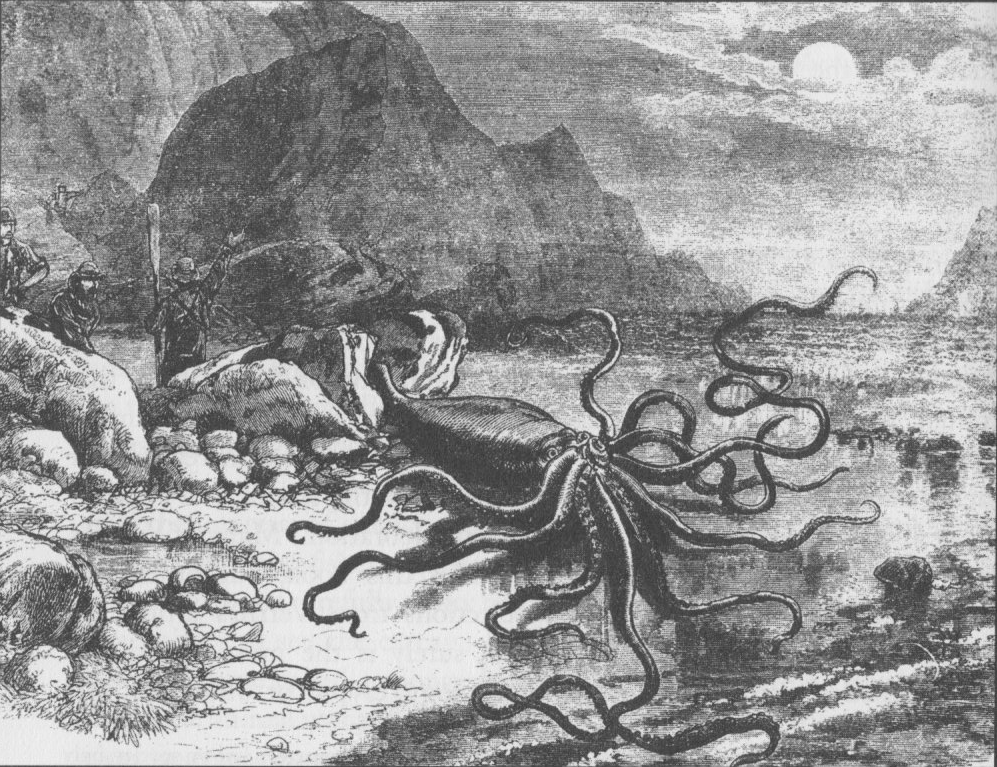
#42 (24/9/1877)
The "nearly perfect specimen" that was beached alive in Catalina, Trinity Bay, Newfoundland, on 24 September 1877, from the 27 October 1877 issue of Canadian Illustrated News ([Anon.], 1877a:269, fig.)

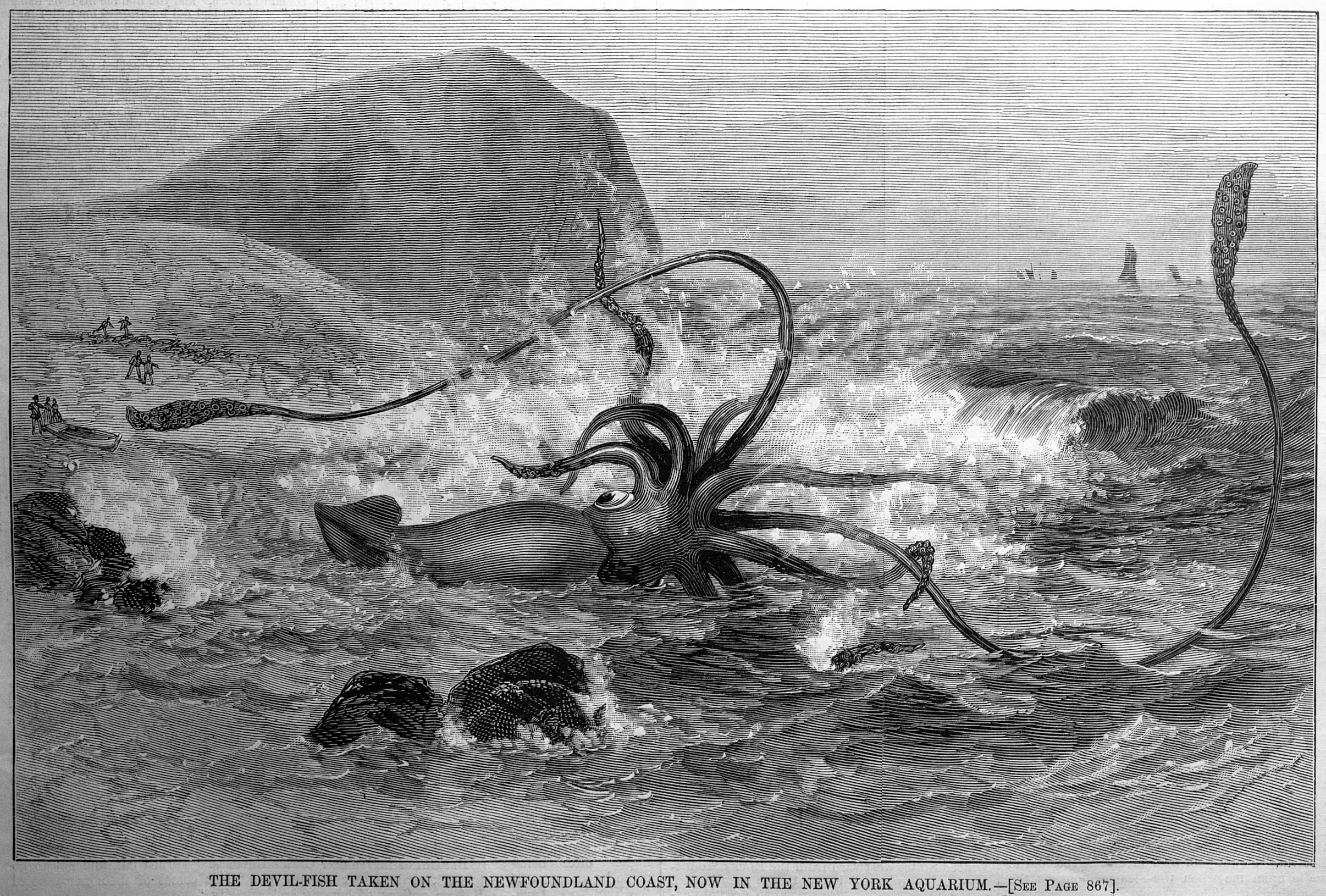
#42 (24/9/1877)
Illustration of the "devil-fish" from Catalina, from the 3 November 1877 issue of Harper's Weekly ([Anon.], 1877b:868, fig.)

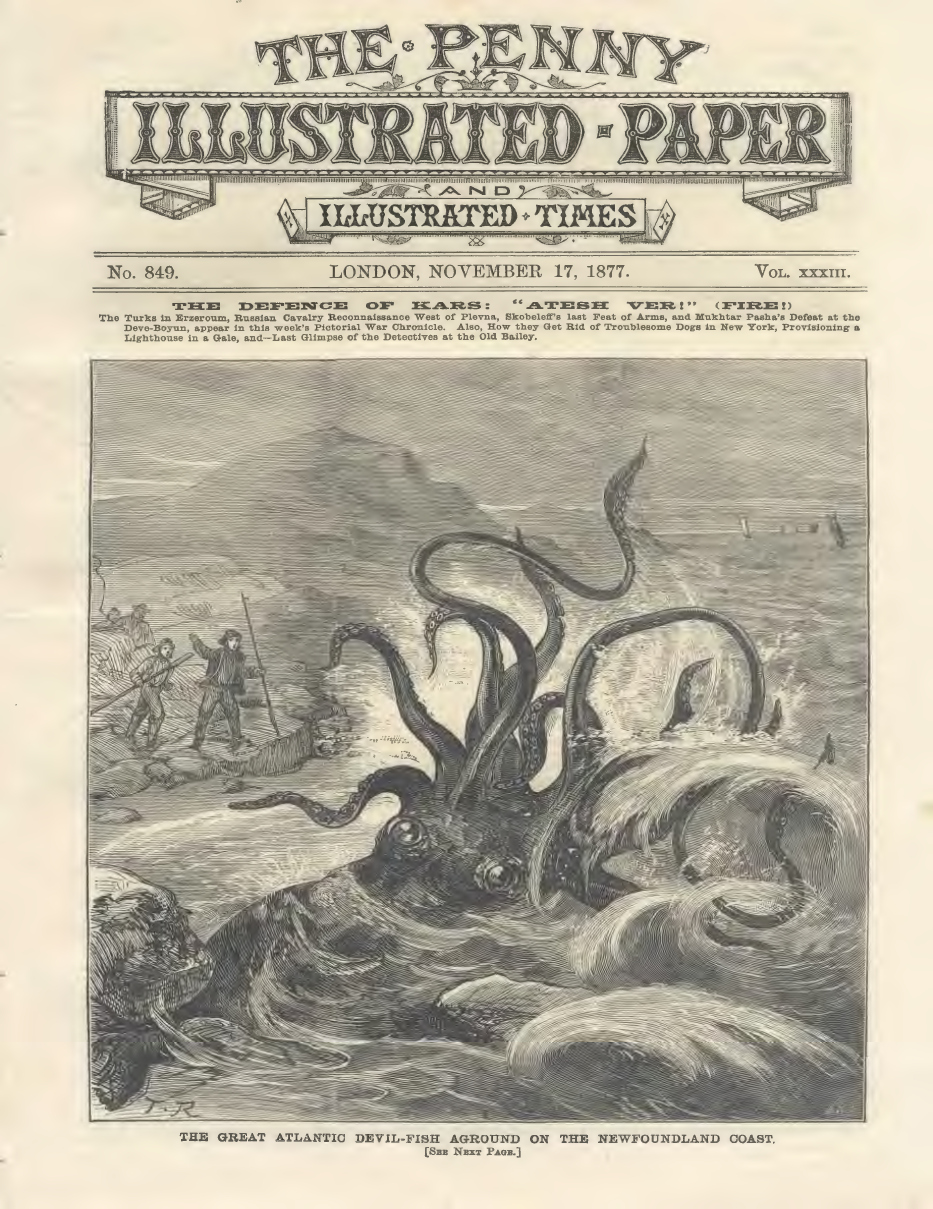
#42 (24/9/1877)
Another depiction of the Catalina specimen, from the cover of the 17 November 1877 issue of The Penny Illustrated Paper and Illustrated Times ([Anon.], 1877c:305, fig.)

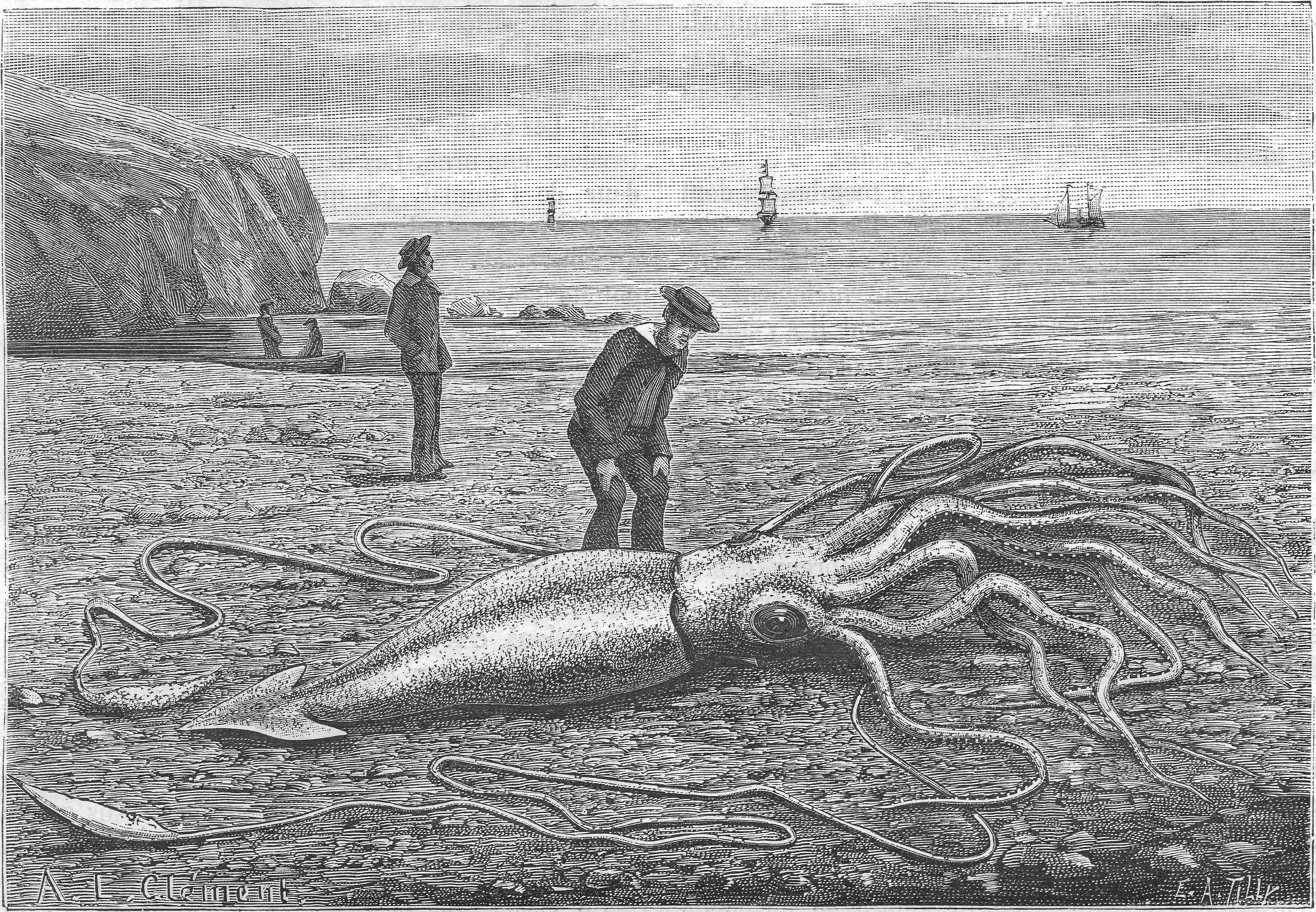
#42 (24/9/1877)
A further illustration of the Catalina specimen, showing the animal after it had died (see related figure), from the 9 June 1883 issue of the French popular science magazine La Nature (Oustalet, 1883:17, fig. 1; also reproduced in Heuvelmans, 2003:fig. 103).

#42 (24/9/1877)
Drawing by A. E. Verrill of the Catalina specimen, here incorrectly identified as the Fortune Bay specimen (#34); see original illustration (Verrill, 1880a:pl. 20)

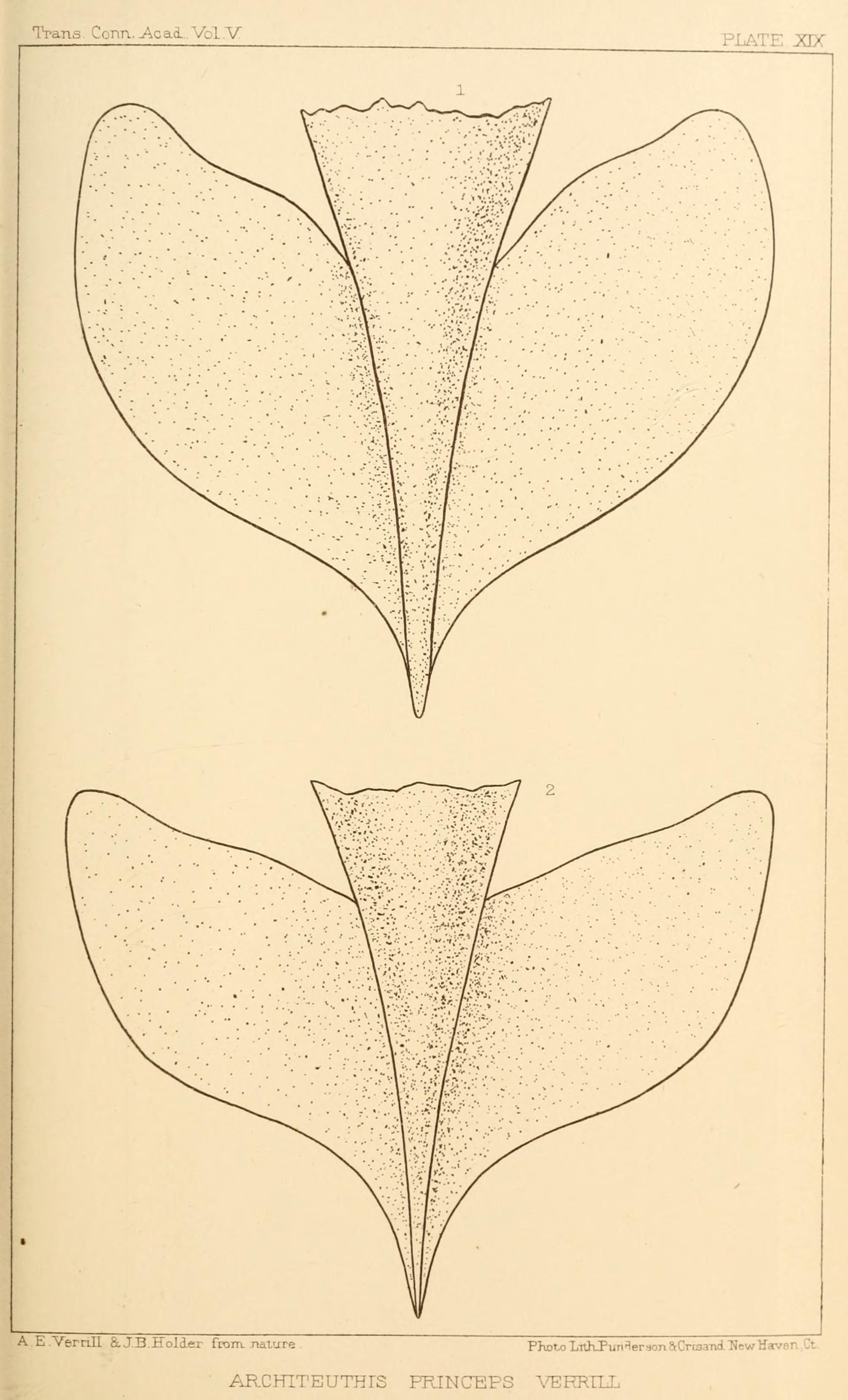
#42 (24/9/1877)
Ventral views of the supposedly anteriorly-free caudal fins of the Catalina specimen (top: after several days in alcohol; bottom: after several months in same), now known to be a preservation artefact (Verrill, 1880a:pl. 19)

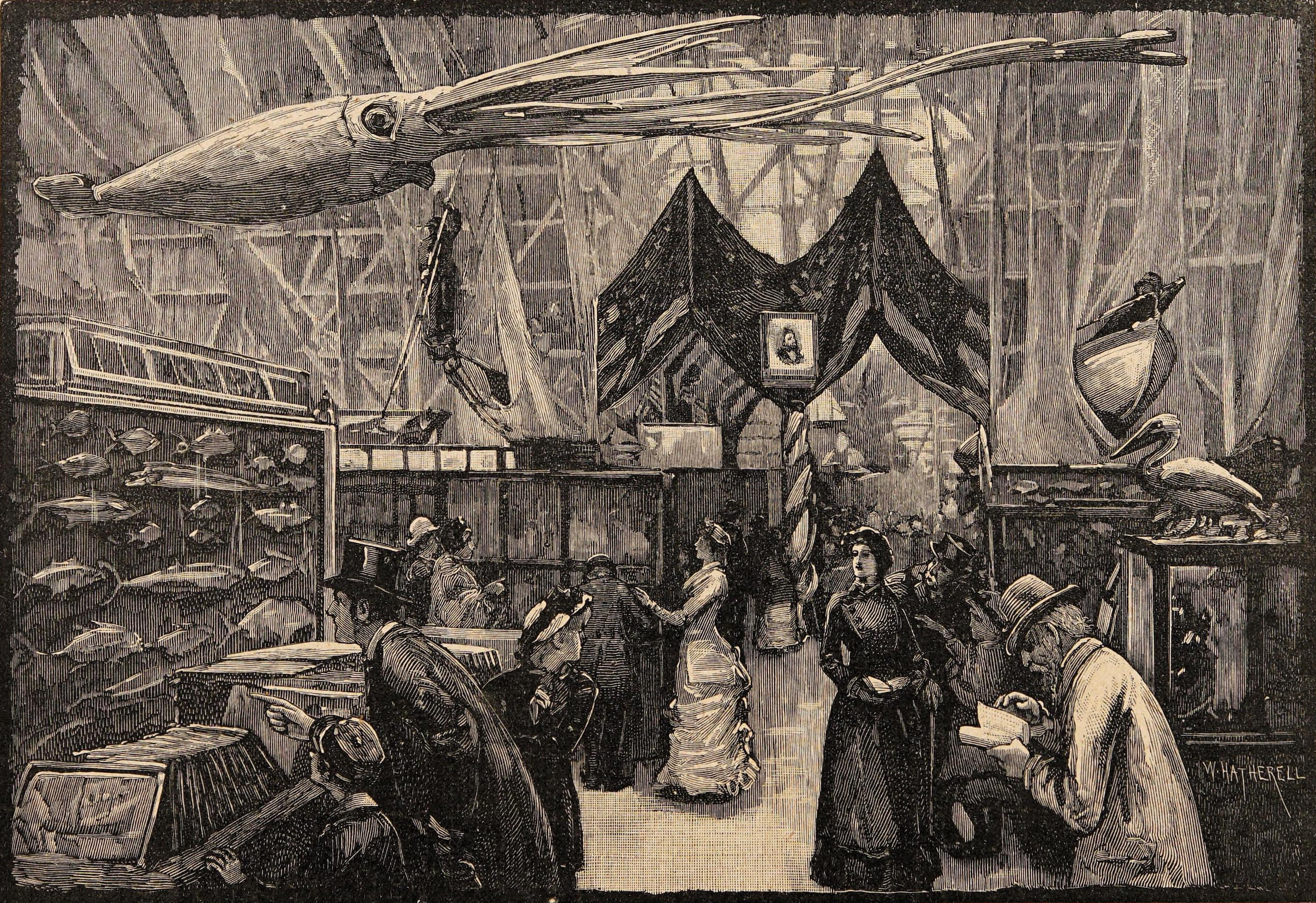
#42 (24/9/1877)
The US display at the International Fisheries Exhibition of 1883, held in London, UK (illustration by William Hatherell, from Cassell, 1903:600, fig.). An Architeuthis princeps model, made by J. H. Emerton and A. E. Verrill for the Smithsonian and based on the Catalina specimen, is seen hanging in the background.

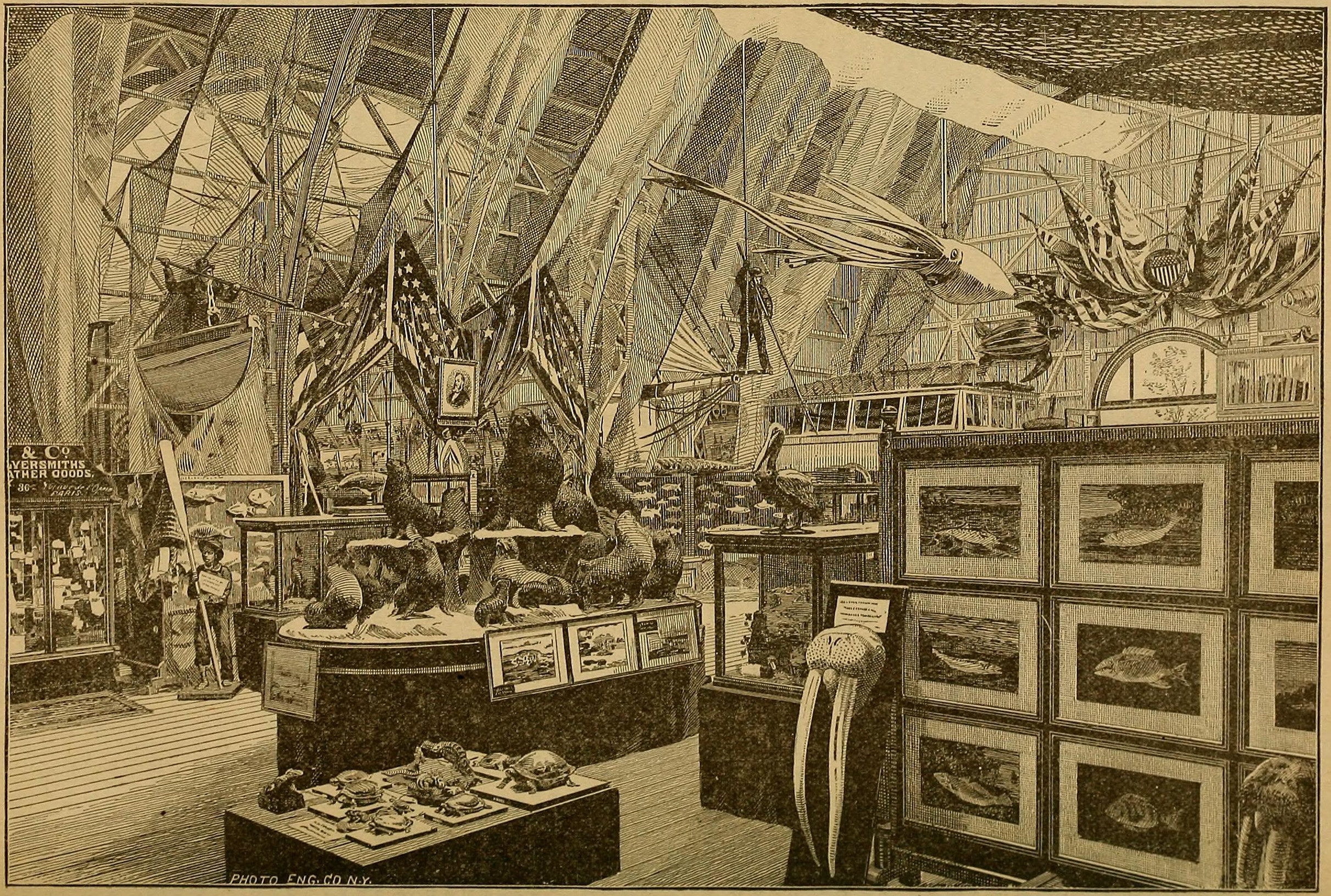
#42 (24/9/1877)
Another illustration of the American court at the International Fisheries Exhibition of 1883, with a giant squid model based on the Catalina specimen hanging overhead, from the fourth of a series of papers about the exhibition published in Science by American ichthyologist George Brown Goode (Goode, 1883:614, fig.).

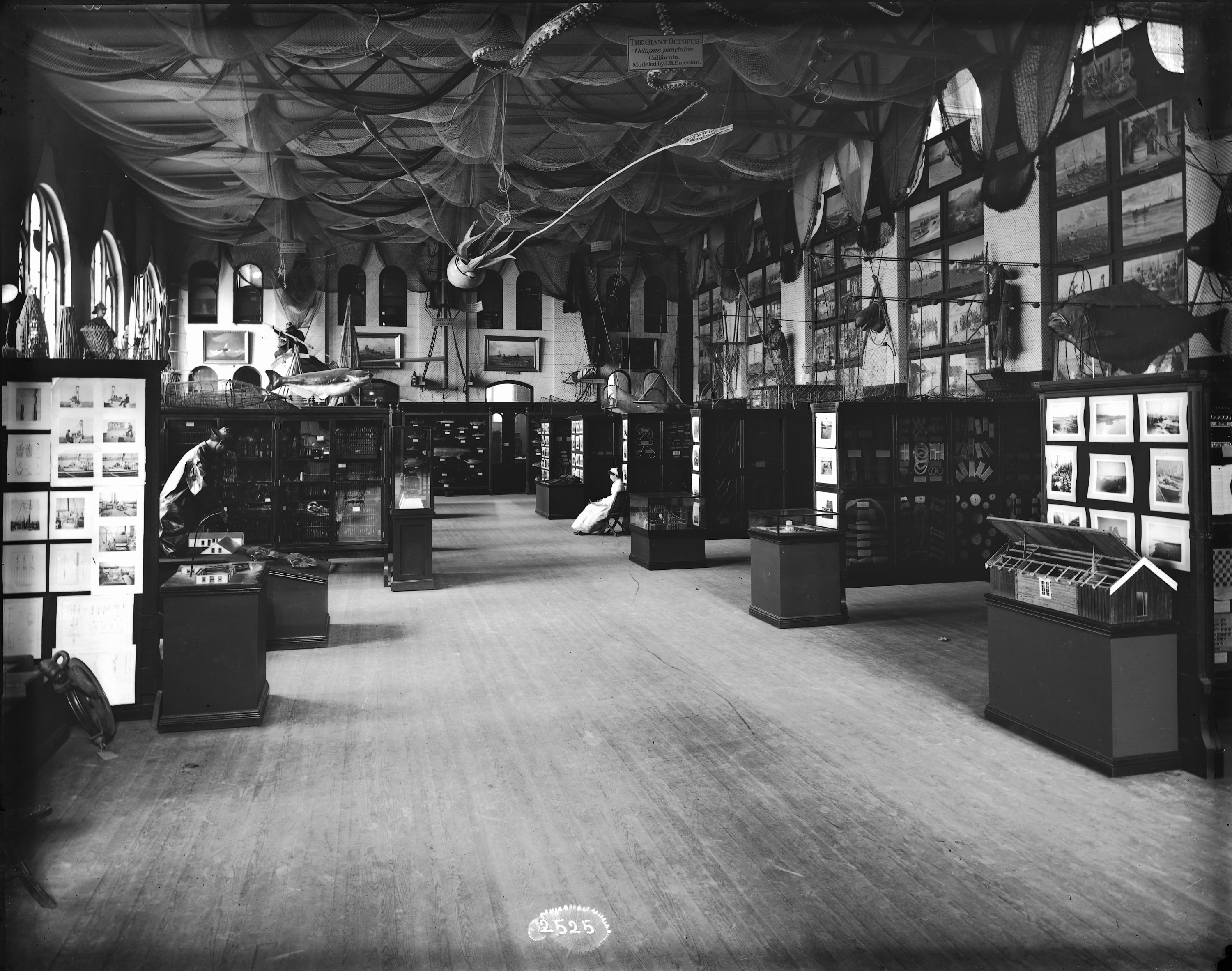
#42 (24/9/1877)
Fisheries Court exhibit at the United States National Museum in Washington, D.C. (in what is now the Arts and Industries Building), as it appeared in 1886. J. H. Emerton's giant squid and giant octopus models are suspended from the ceiling surrounded by fishing nets (see also engraving of same).

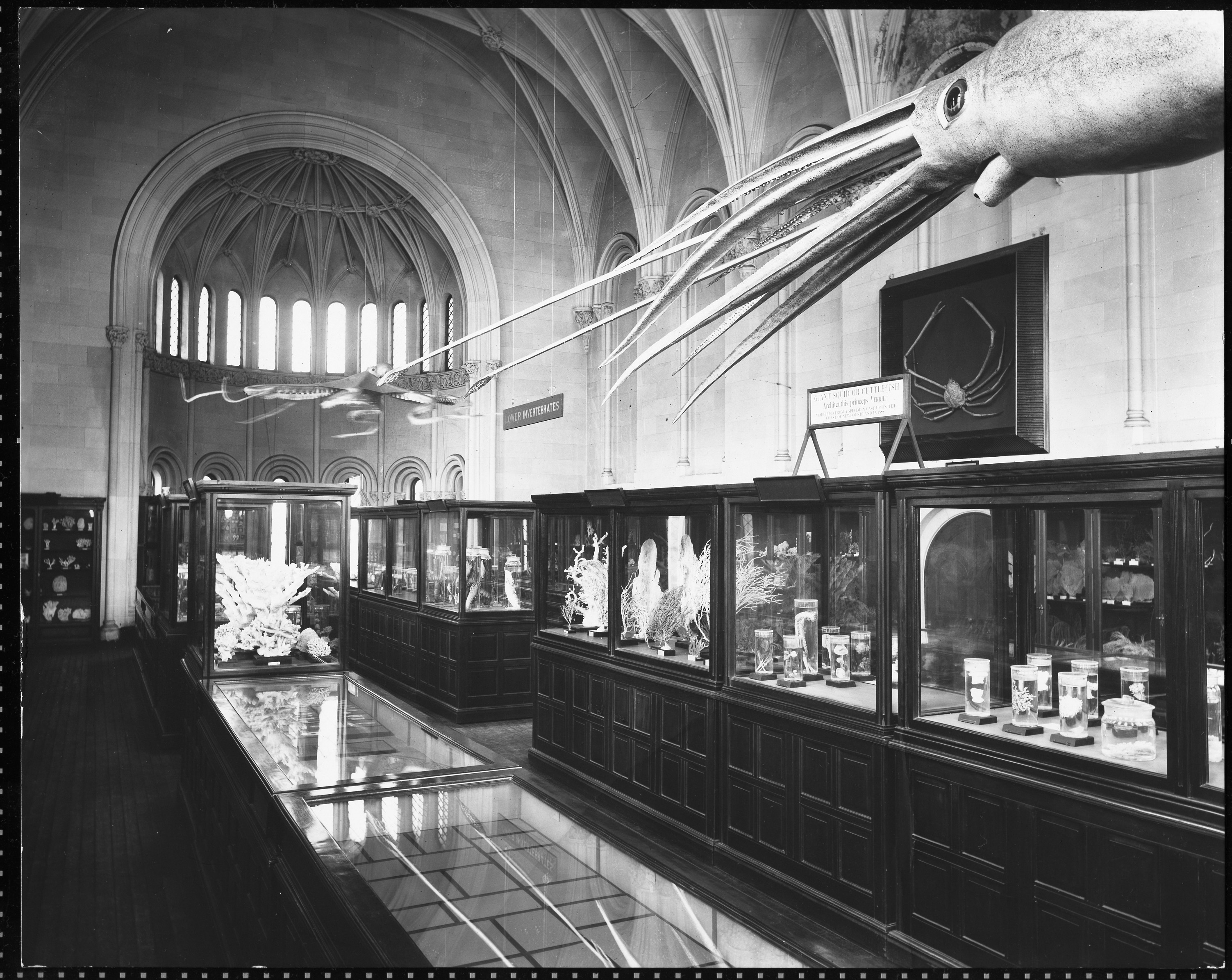
#42 (24/9/1877)
Hanging models of a giant squid (based on the Catalina specimen) and a giant Pacific octopus, designed for the Tennessee Centennial and International Exposition of 1897, as they appeared in the Lower Invertebrates exhibit in the West Wing of the Smithsonian Institution Building c. 1901 (see also image from c. 1903).

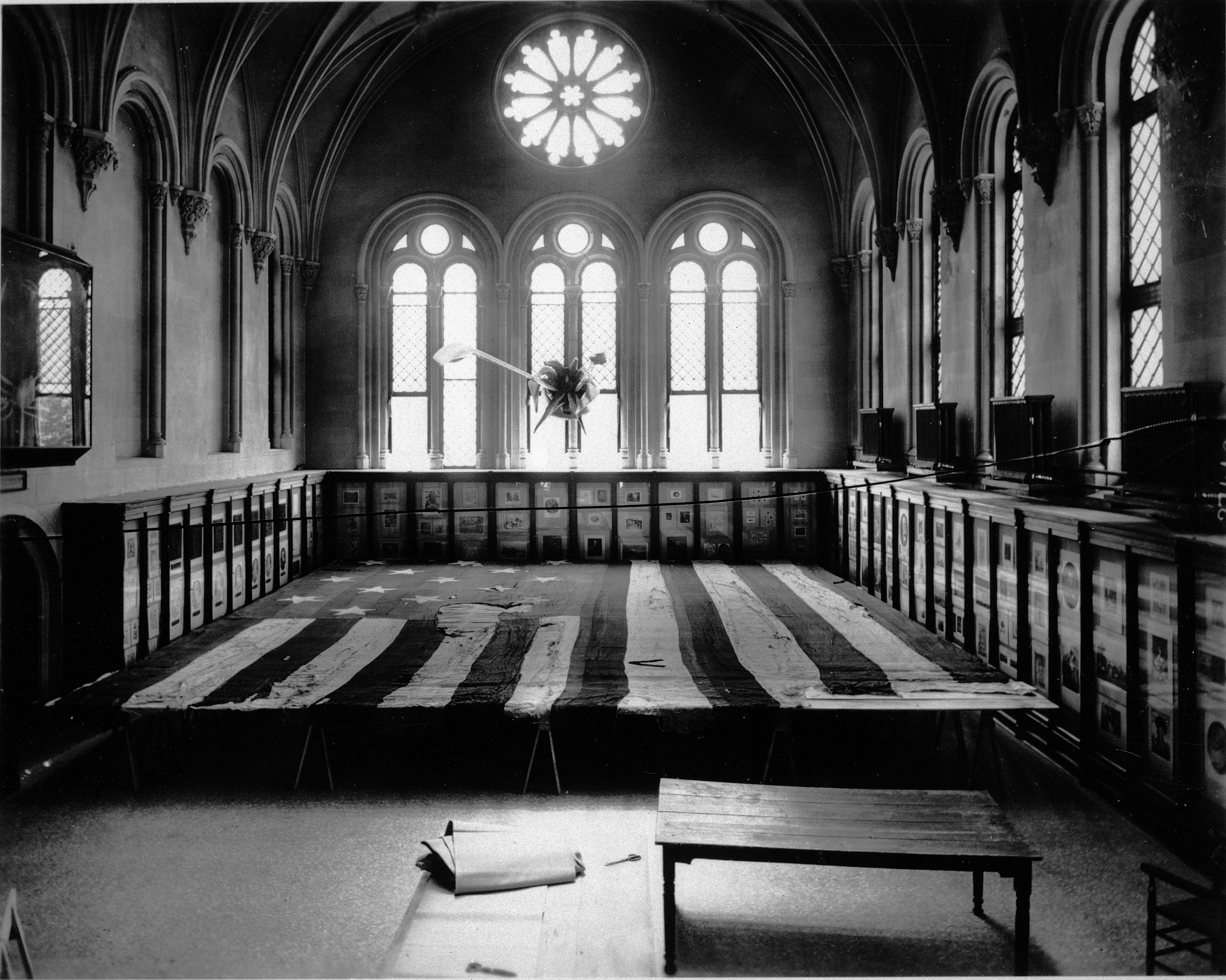
#42 (24/9/1877)
The original Star-Spangled Banner flag undergoing restoration work in 1914 in the West Wing of the Smithsonian Institution Building, under the hanging giant squid model, one of the few exhibits not removed for the occasion (see also photograph showing seamstresses at work under the guidance of Amelia Fowler)

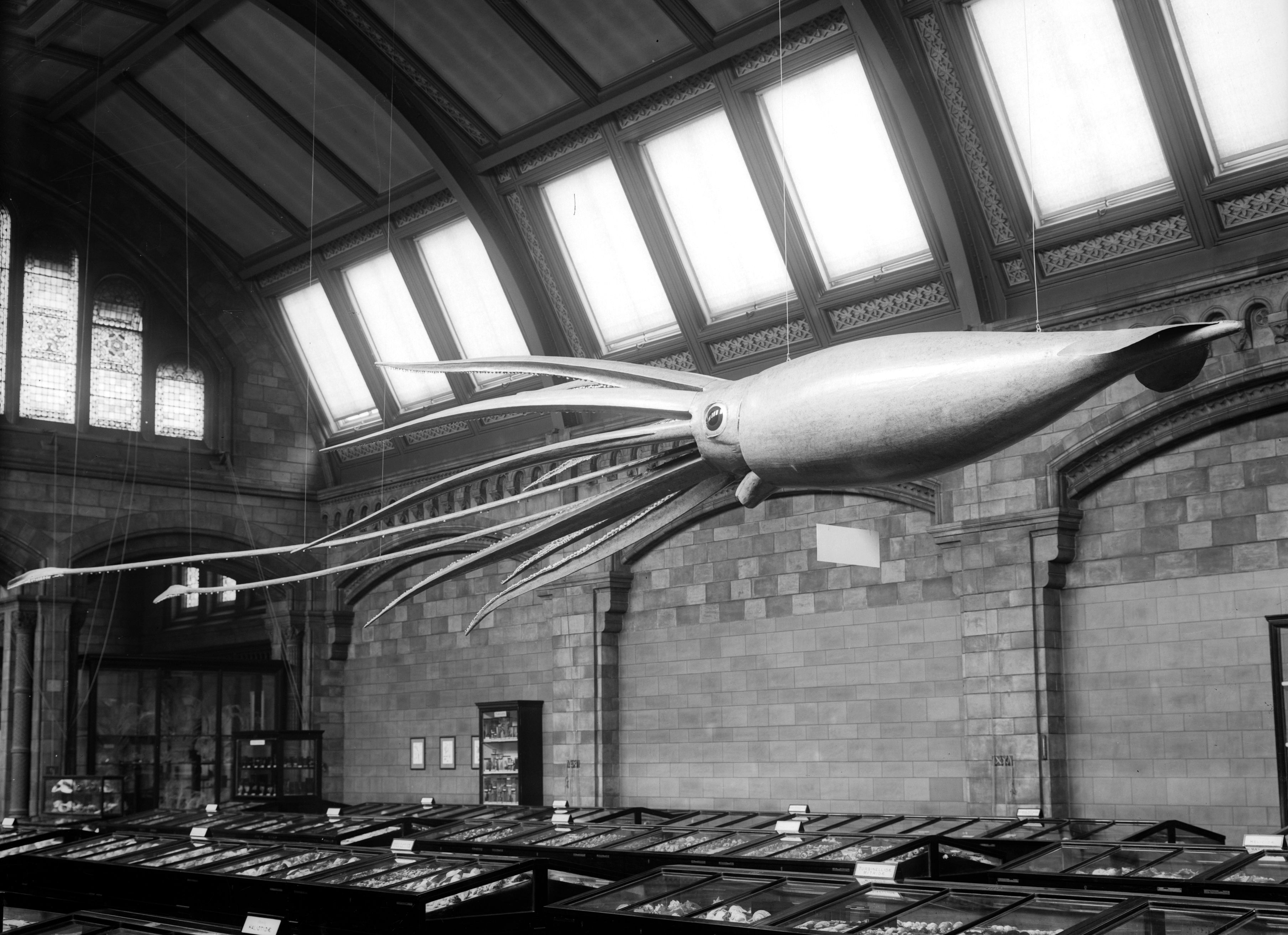
#42 (24/9/1877)
Catalina-inspired model on display in the Shell Gallery (now Jerwood Gallery) of London's Natural History Museum in 1907. Bought in 1906 for US$450 (equivalent to $16,125 in 2025) from Ward's Natural Science Establishment of Rochester, New York, it was installed a year later. It was destroyed during the Blitz in 1940; the second and current model dates from 1974.

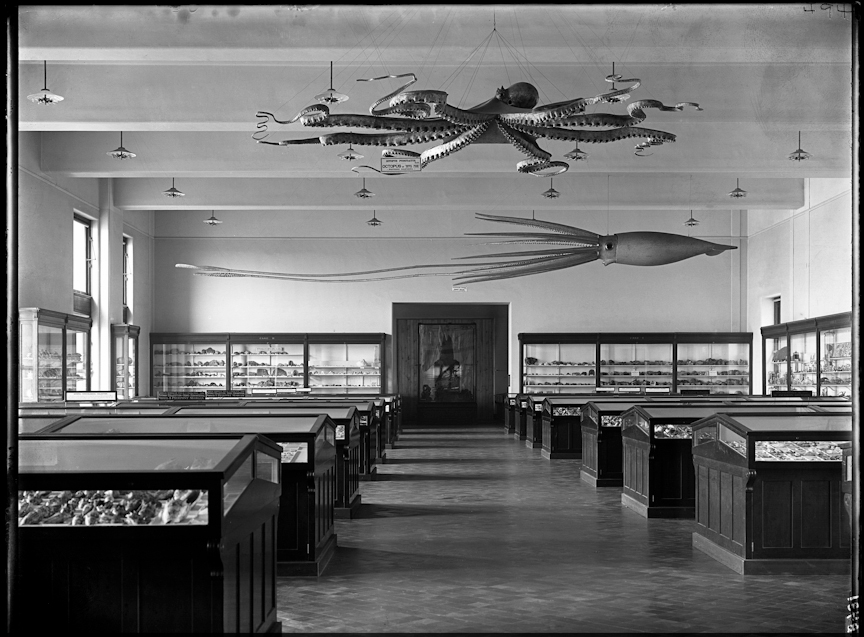
#42 (24/9/1877)
Ward's models of the Catalina giant squid and a giant Pacific octopus, suspended from the ceiling of the American Museum of Natural History's Shell and Coral Hall, early 20th century. The squid was later moved to the Hall of Ocean Life, the Invertebrate Hall, and, following refurbishment, the "Wall of Life" in the Hall of Biodiversity (see 2015 image). Both models were acquired in 1895 for a total of US$750 (equivalent to $29,025 in 2025).

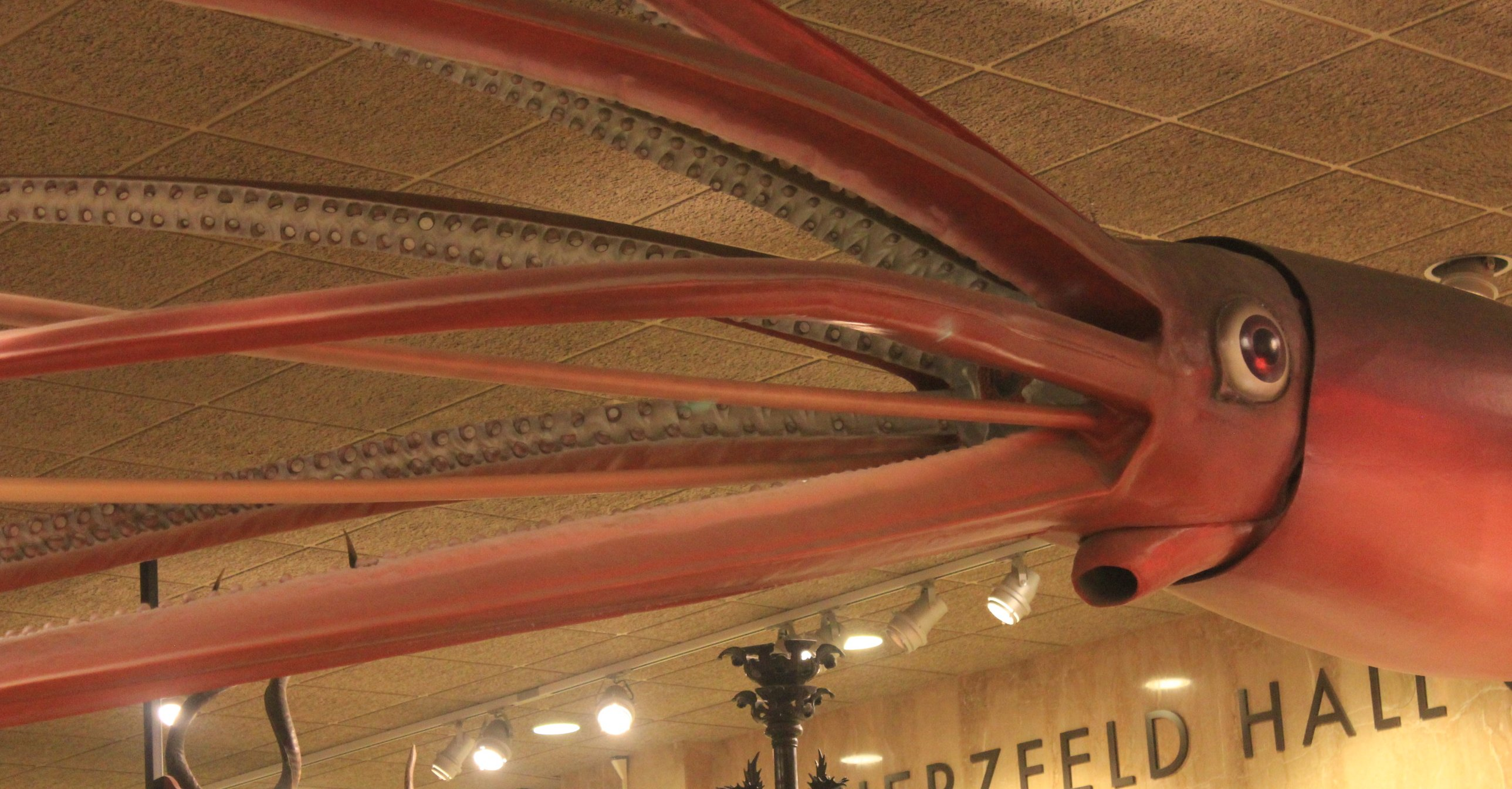
#42 (24/9/1877)
One of Ward's six original Catalina-inspired models is still extant at the Milwaukee Public Museum. Dating from 1898, it was purchased the following year after a protracted sale. The model was refurbished towards the end of the 20th century; taxidermist and artist Wendy Christensen-Senk repainted it a "more passionate reddish maroon" from its previous "battleship gray".

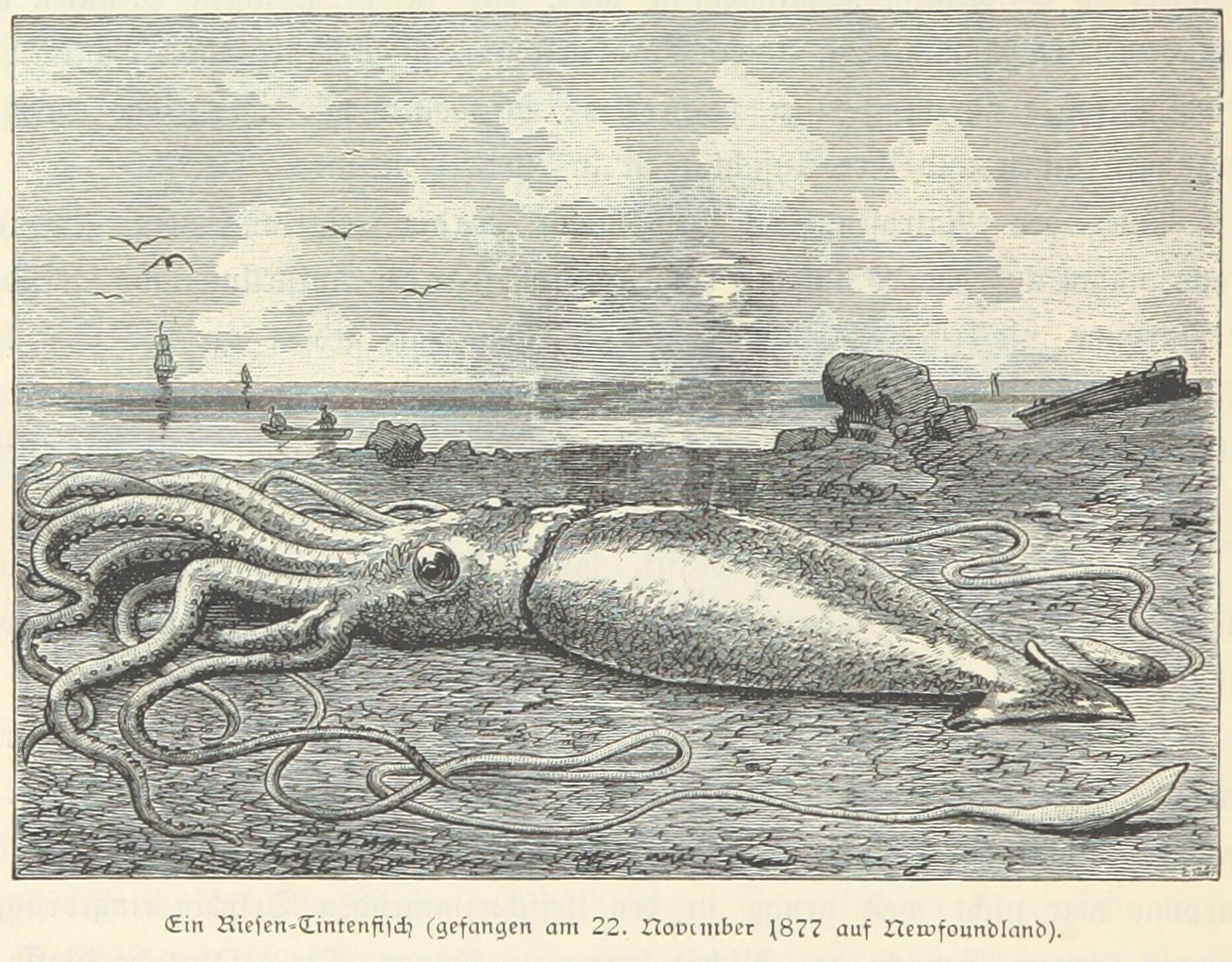
?#44 (21/11/1877)
Giant squid beached on the Newfoundland coast, apparently on 22 November 1877 (Heydebrand und der Lasa, 1887:72, fig.; closest is #44 from 21 November, from Smith's Sound). Two figures standing over the specimen, which are present in the original, have been removed in this version. Note the similarity to this illustration of the Catalina specimen.

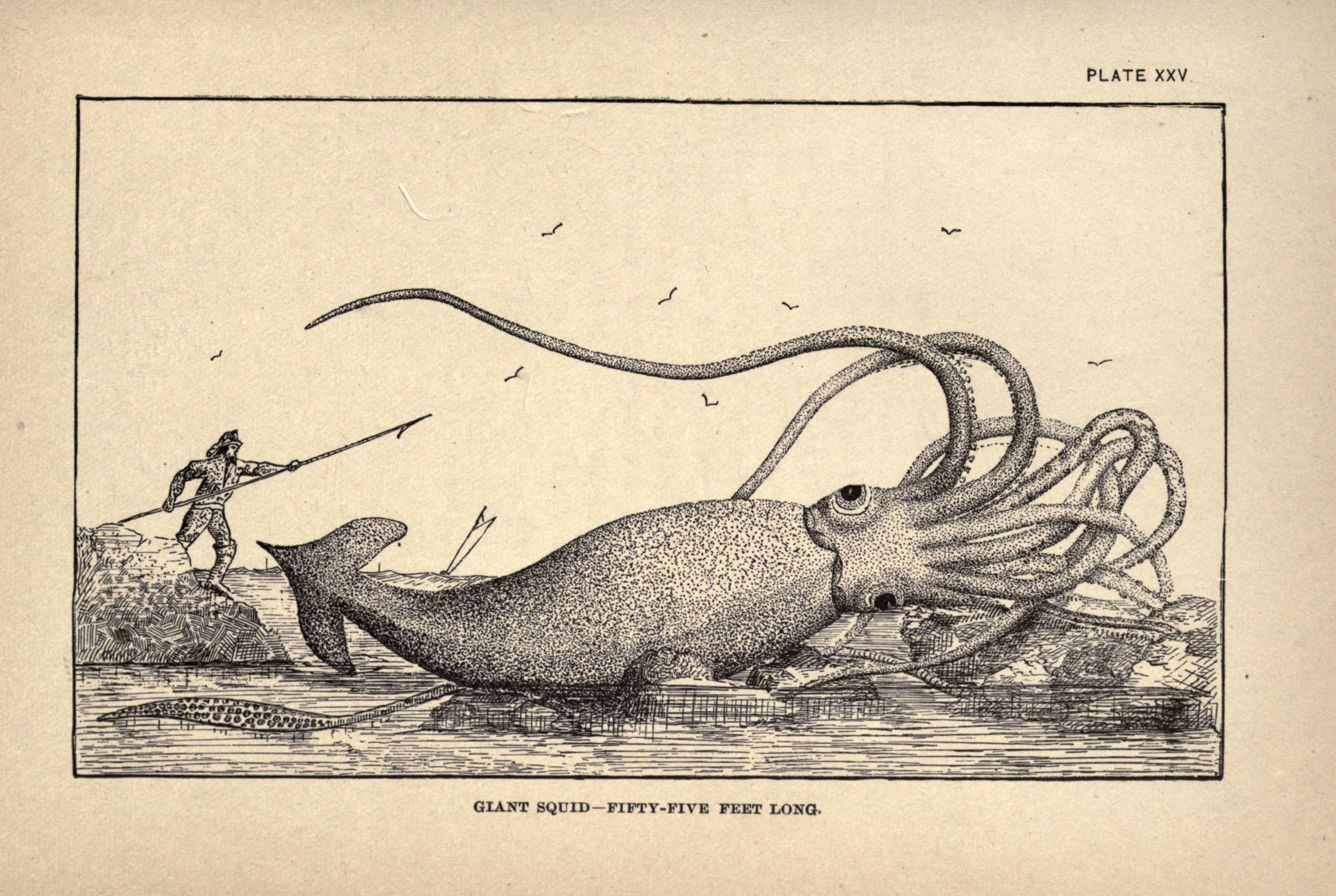
#45 (2/11/1878)
Artist's impression of the "Thimble Tickle specimen" found on 2 November 1878, which reportedly measured 55 feet (17 m) in total length, from Charles Frederick Holder's Marvels of Animal Life (Holder, 1885:198, pl. 25). No photographs or exact measurements exist as the specimen was cut up for dog food soon after its discovery.

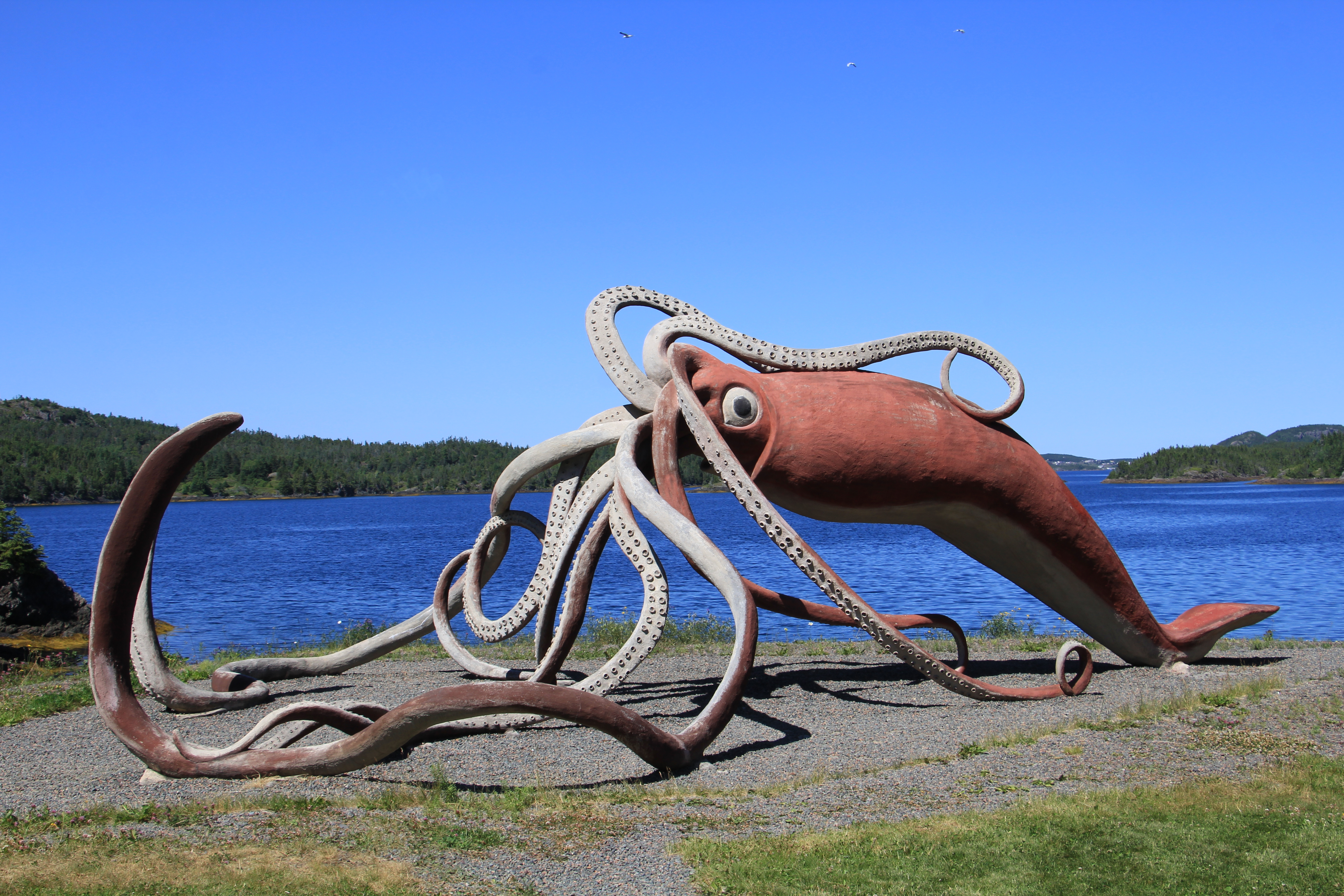
#45 (2/11/1878)
A "life-sized" (55-foot) concrete and metal sculpture of the Thimble Tickle giant squid of 1878. Completed in 2001 and weighing 4 tonnes, it was designed by Don Foulds and built by him and his students, following a CA$100,000 government contribution (equivalent to US$64,568 in 2025).

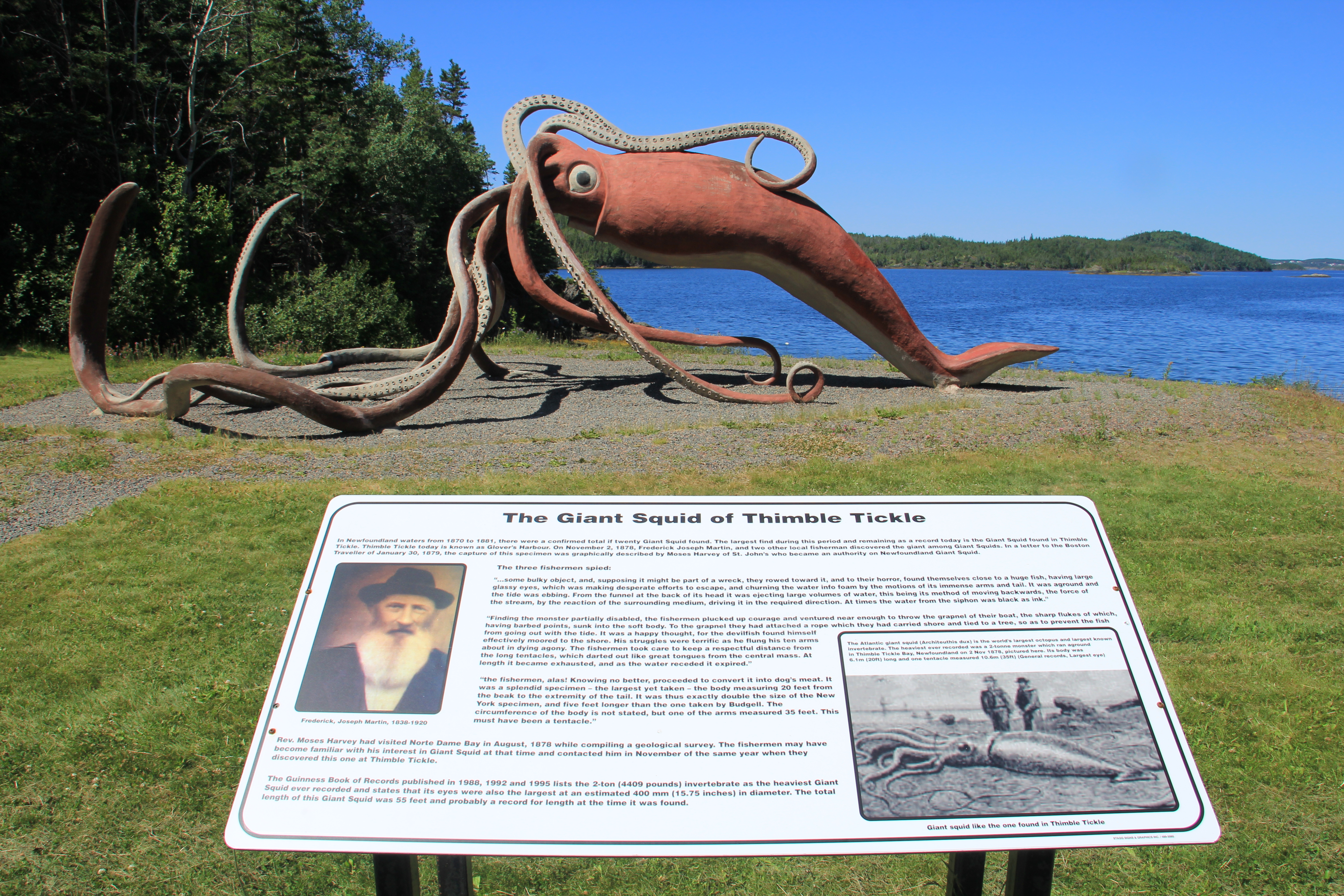
#45 (2/11/1878)
Another view of the sculpture showing the accompanying information plaque (compare the giant squid illustration therein with this modified version). Part of the Giant Squid Interpretation Site, the sculpture is located close to the site of the original specimen's capture and has featured on a Canada Post stamp.

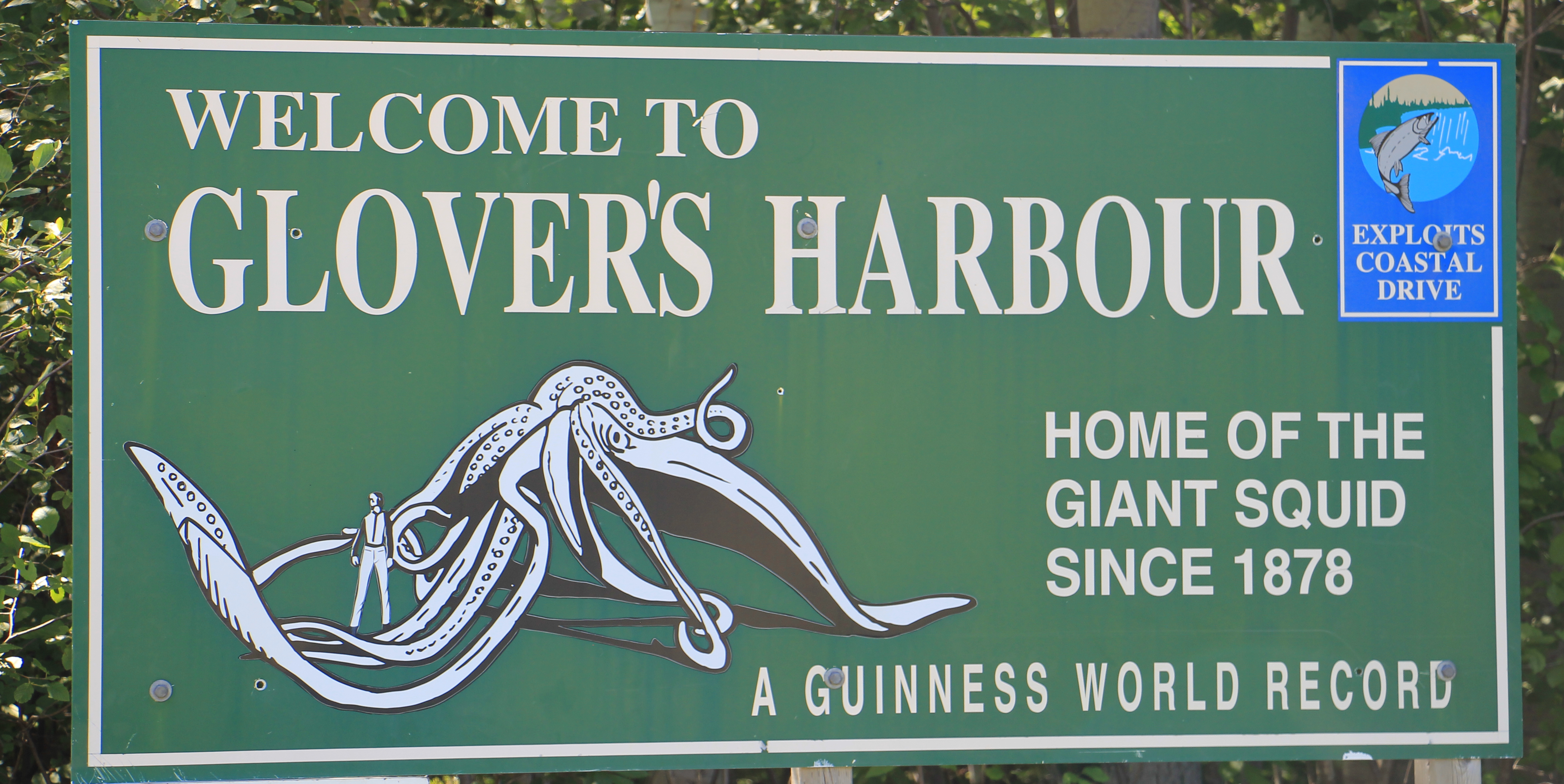
#45 (2/11/1878)
Welcome sign from Glovers Harbour (formerly Thimble Tickle), Newfoundland, where the giant specimen of 1878 was found. It has long been regarded by Guinness World Records and its previous incarnations as the largest giant squid ever recorded.

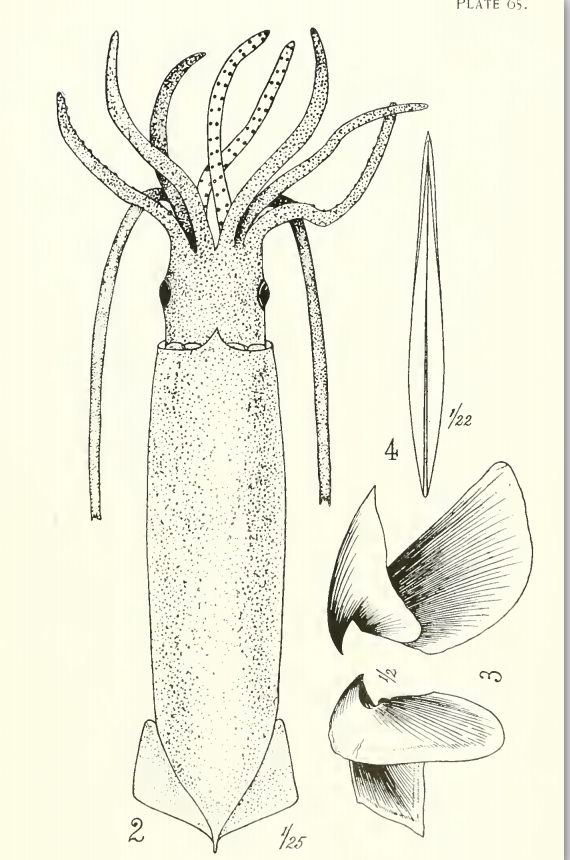
#47 (23/5/1879)
Holotype of Thomas William Kirk's Steenstrupia stockii, from the type description (Kirk, 1882:pl. 36 figs. 2–4)

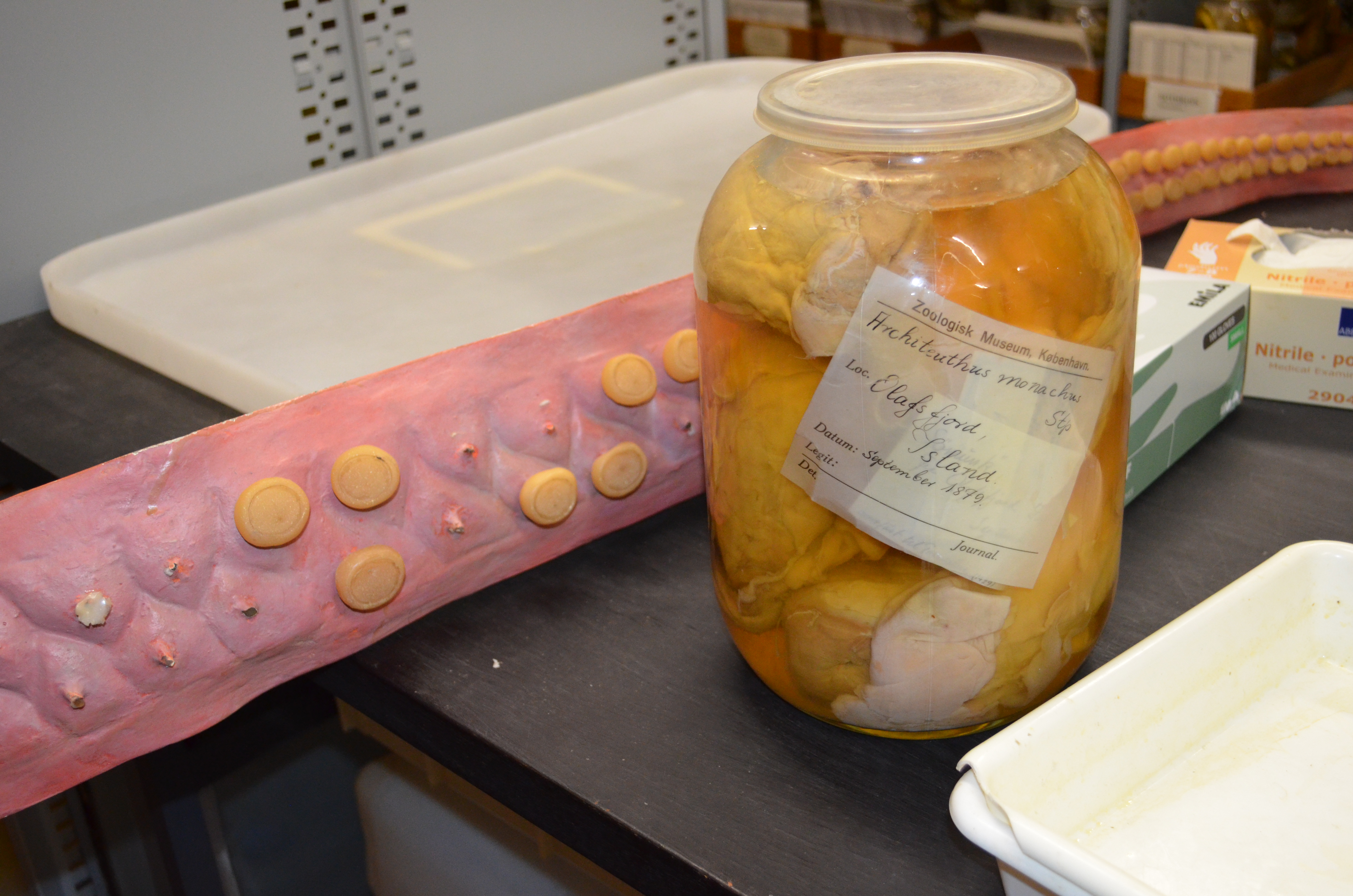
#49 (?/9/1879)
Soft tissue remains of the 1879 specimen from Olafsfjord, Iceland, as they appeared in 2012 at the Zoological Museum in Copenhagen. The material is labelled as Architeuthis monachus, a taxon now considered synonymous with A. dux.

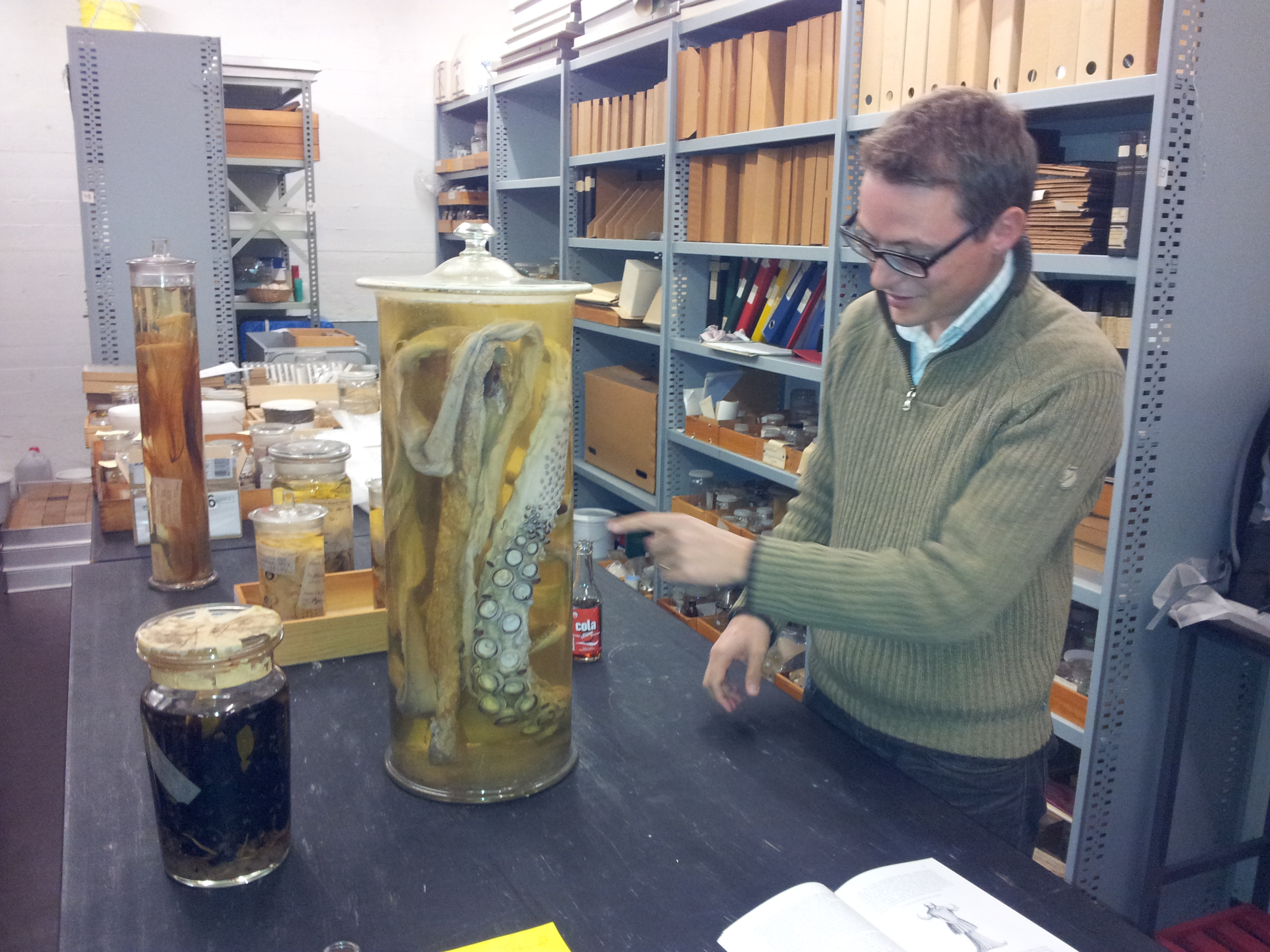
#49 (?/9/1879)
Evolutionary biologist M. Thomas P. Gilbert pointing to the preserved left tentacle of the Olafsfjord giant squid of 1879

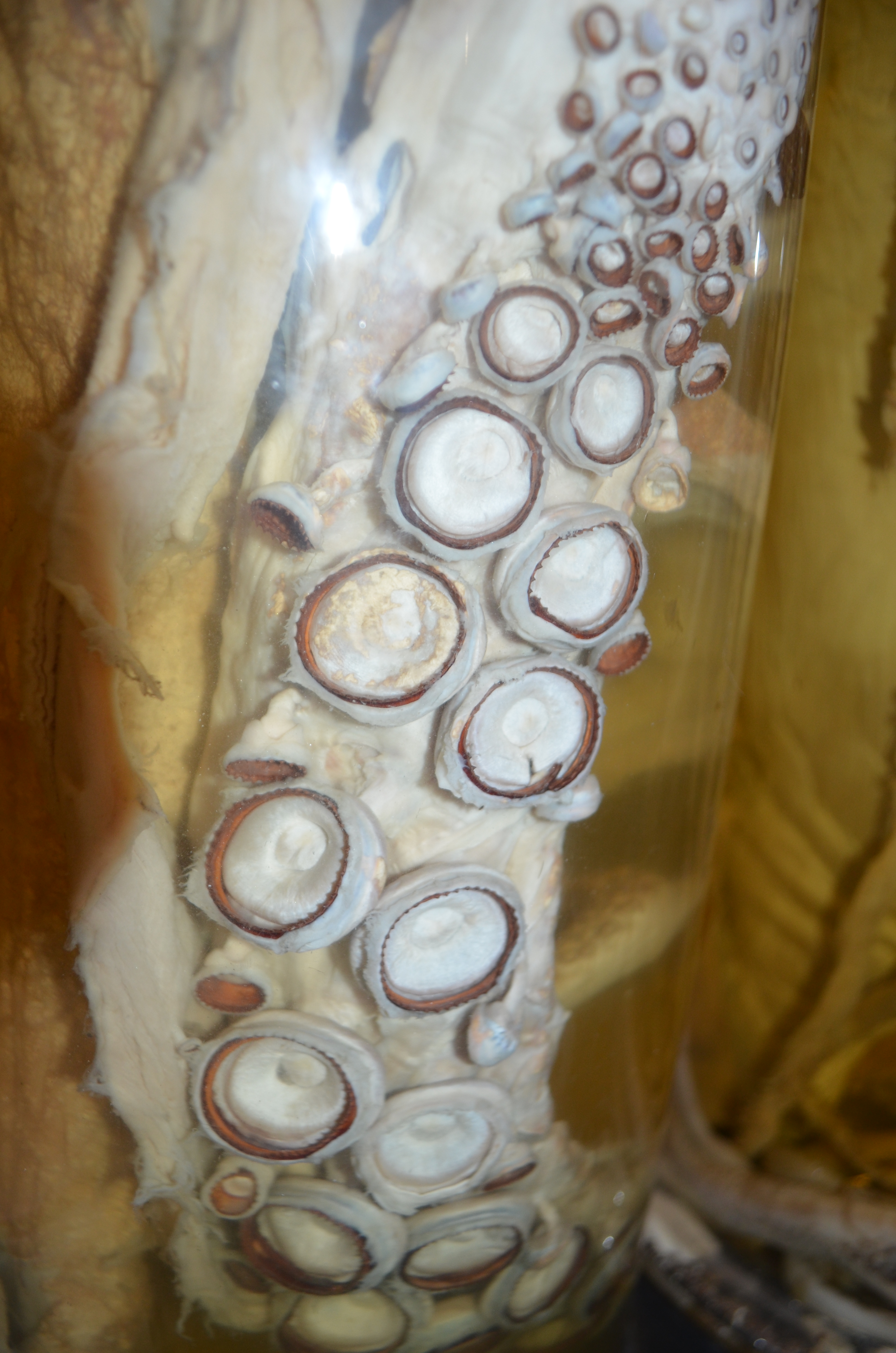
#49 (?/9/1879)
Closeup of the same specimen, showing the enlarged suckers of the tentacular club. The morphology of this tentacle was studied by Roeleveld (2002).

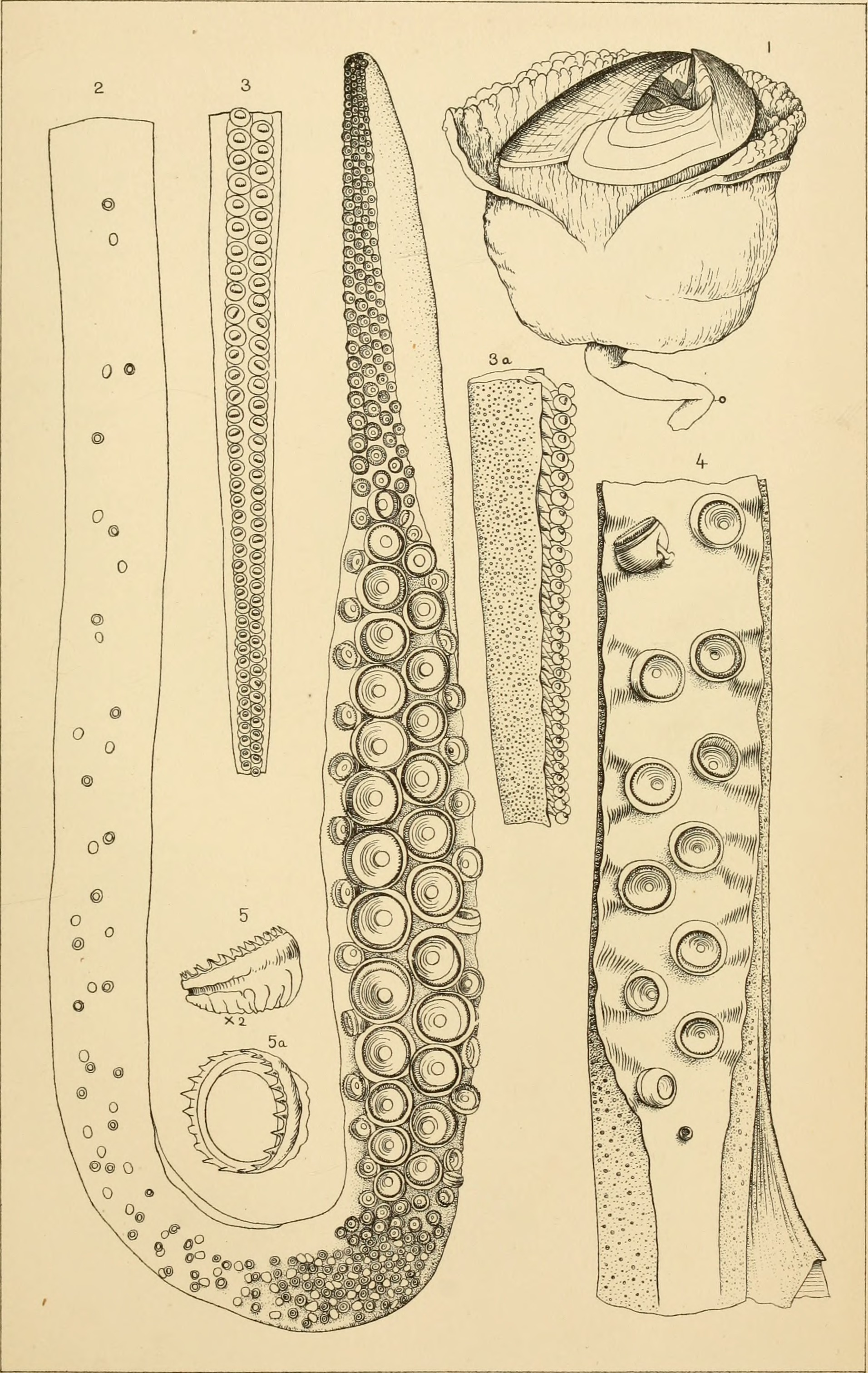
#54 (?/4/1880) and one other
Beak with buccal mass and oesophagus, tentacular club, and arm fragments of the Grand Banks specimen found dead at the surface in April 1880 (#54), the first in which arm and sucker regeneration was documented (Verrill, 1881b:pl. 26). A single sucker (fig. 5) of the first Portugal Cove specimen (#29) is also shown.

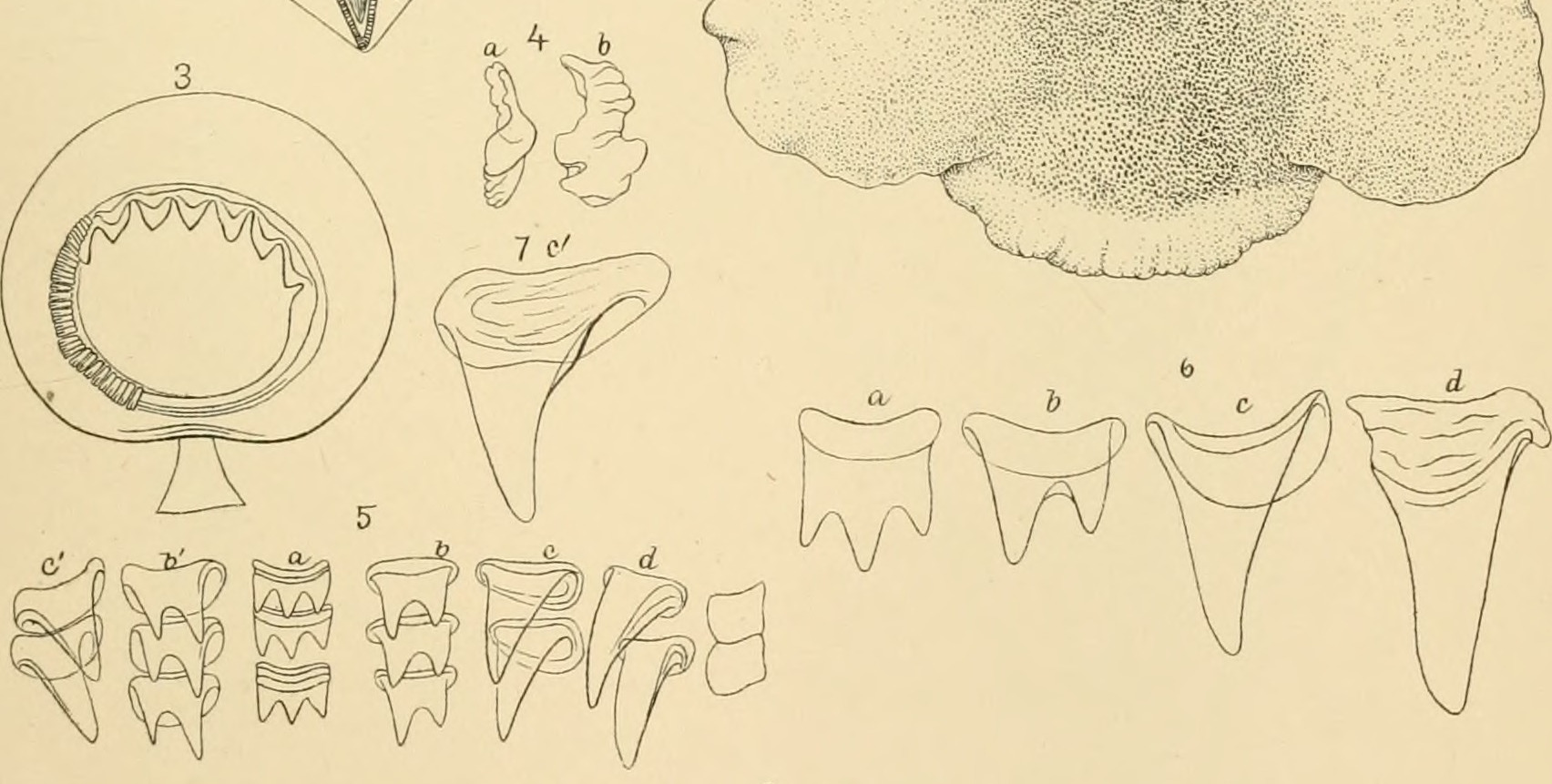
#54 (?/4/1880)
Selected details of the Grand Banks specimen: 50th sucker of one of arms II (fig. 3), statolith in front and lateral aspects (fig. 4), and various views of the radular teeth (figs. 5–7) (Verrill, 1881b:pl. 38 figs. 3–7; see uncropped version)

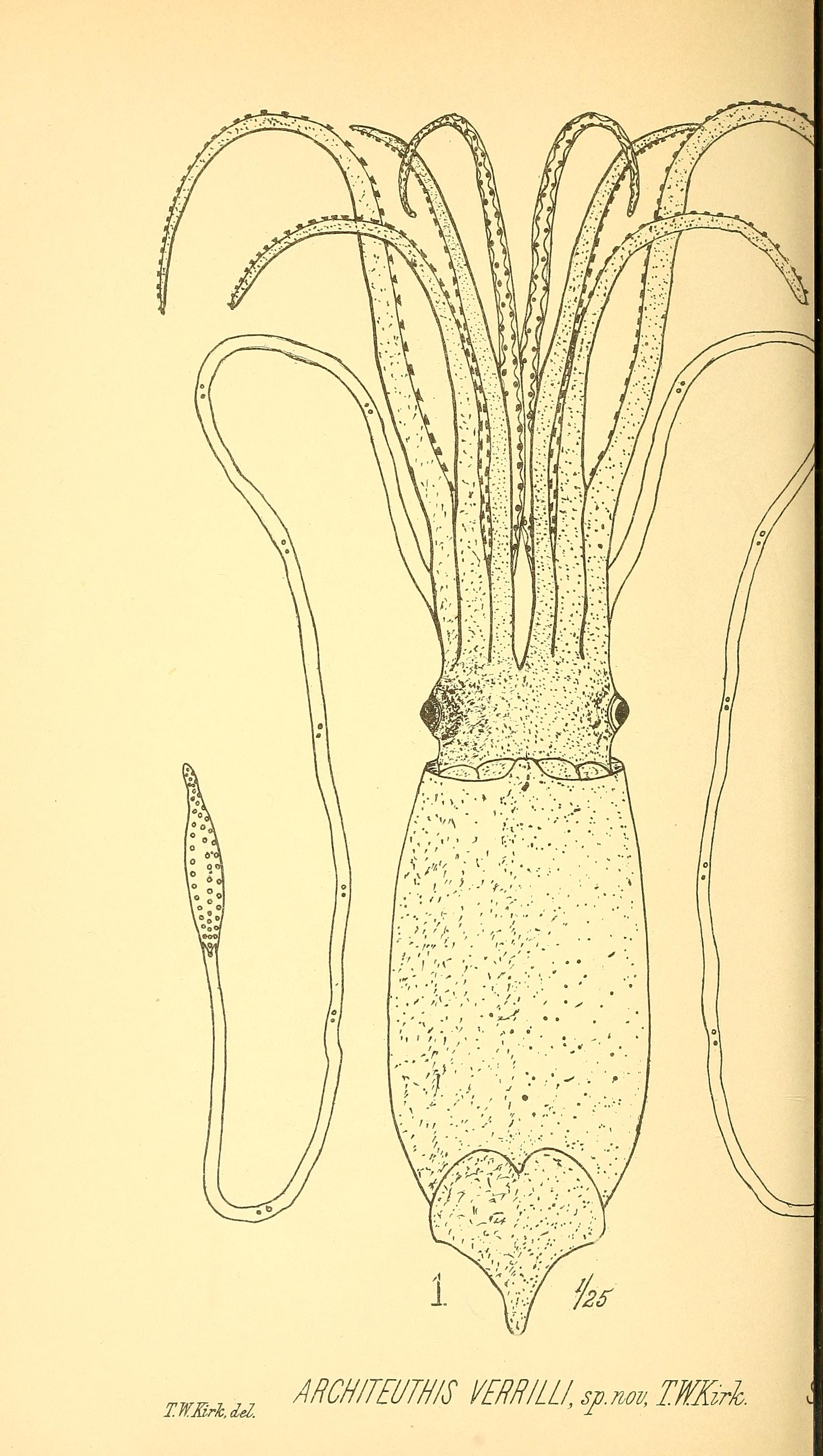
#55 (6/6/1880)
An illustration of the Architeuthis verrilli holotype taken from Thomas William Kirk's formal description of the latter (Kirk, 1882:pl. 36 fig. 1)

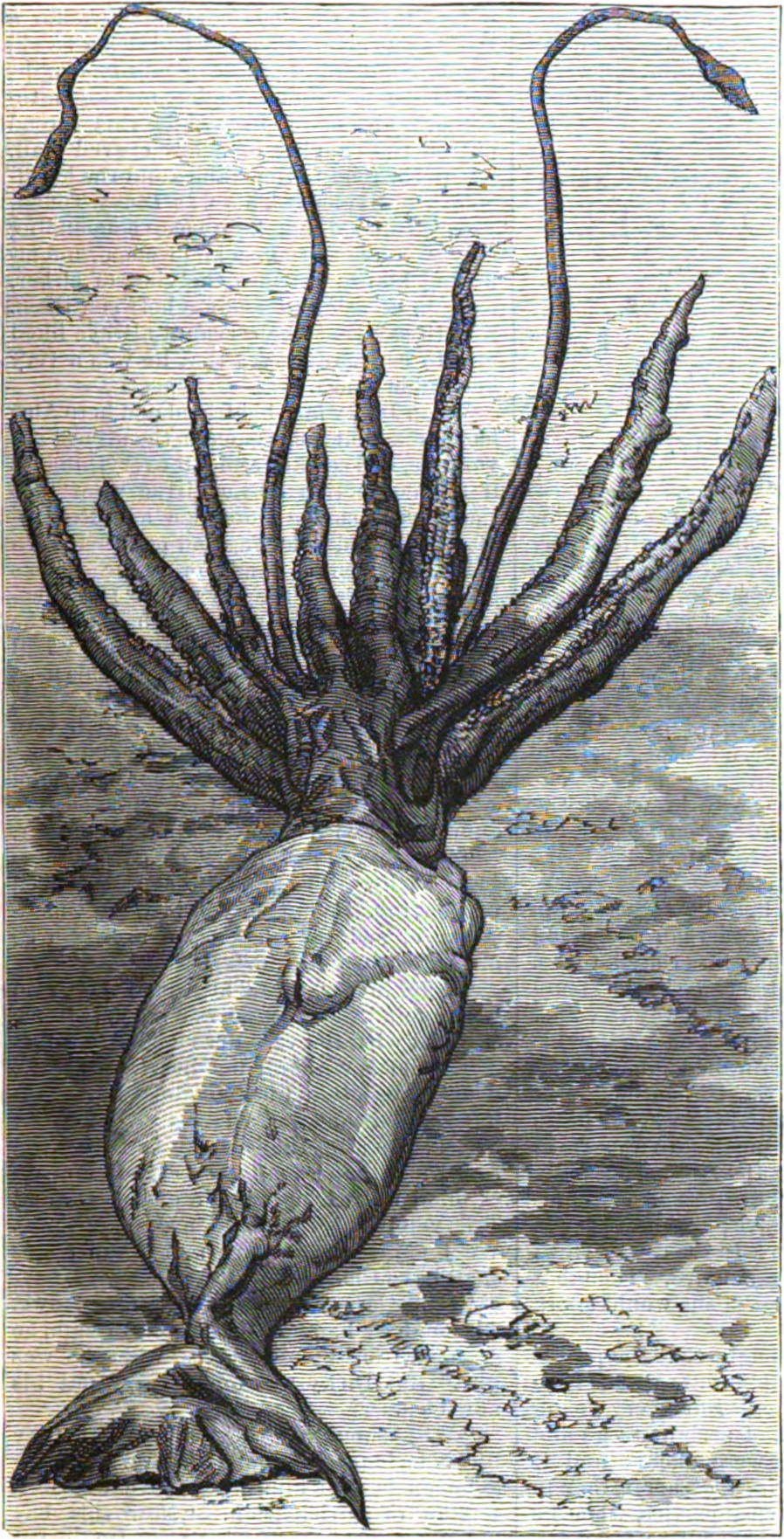
#60 (10/11/1881)
Illustration of the giant squid that was found in Portugal Cove, Newfoundland, on 10 November 1881 (Verrill's penultimate specimen—No. 27). Based on a photograph by E. Lyons of St. John's, it was published in Harper's Weekly for 10 December ([Anon.], 1881:821, fig.).

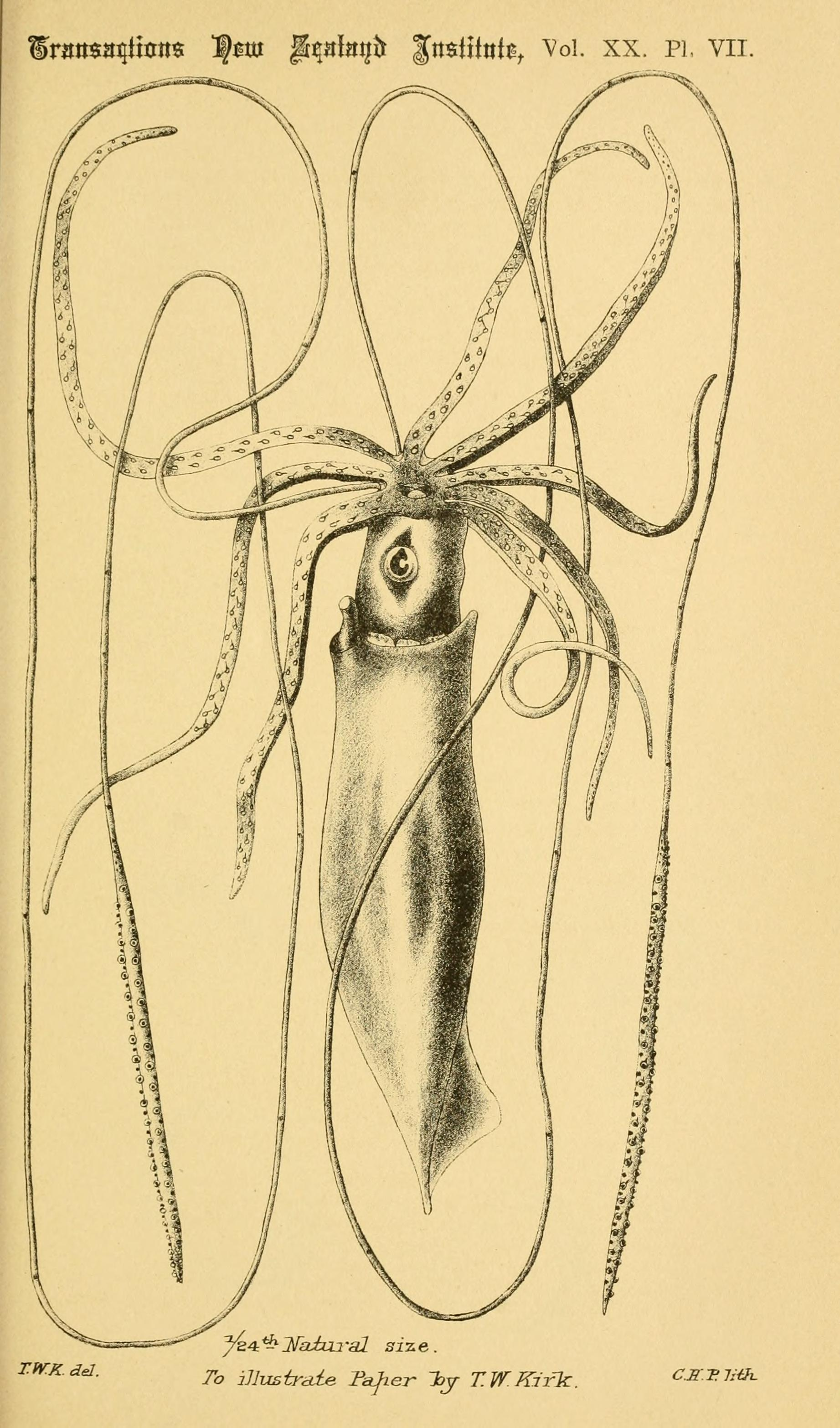
#62 (?/10/1887)
T. W. Kirk's sketch of the Architeuthis longimanus type specimen in lateral aspect (Kirk, 1888:pl. 7). Note the extreme length of the feeding tentacles relative to the mantle and arms, which has been questioned by some authors.

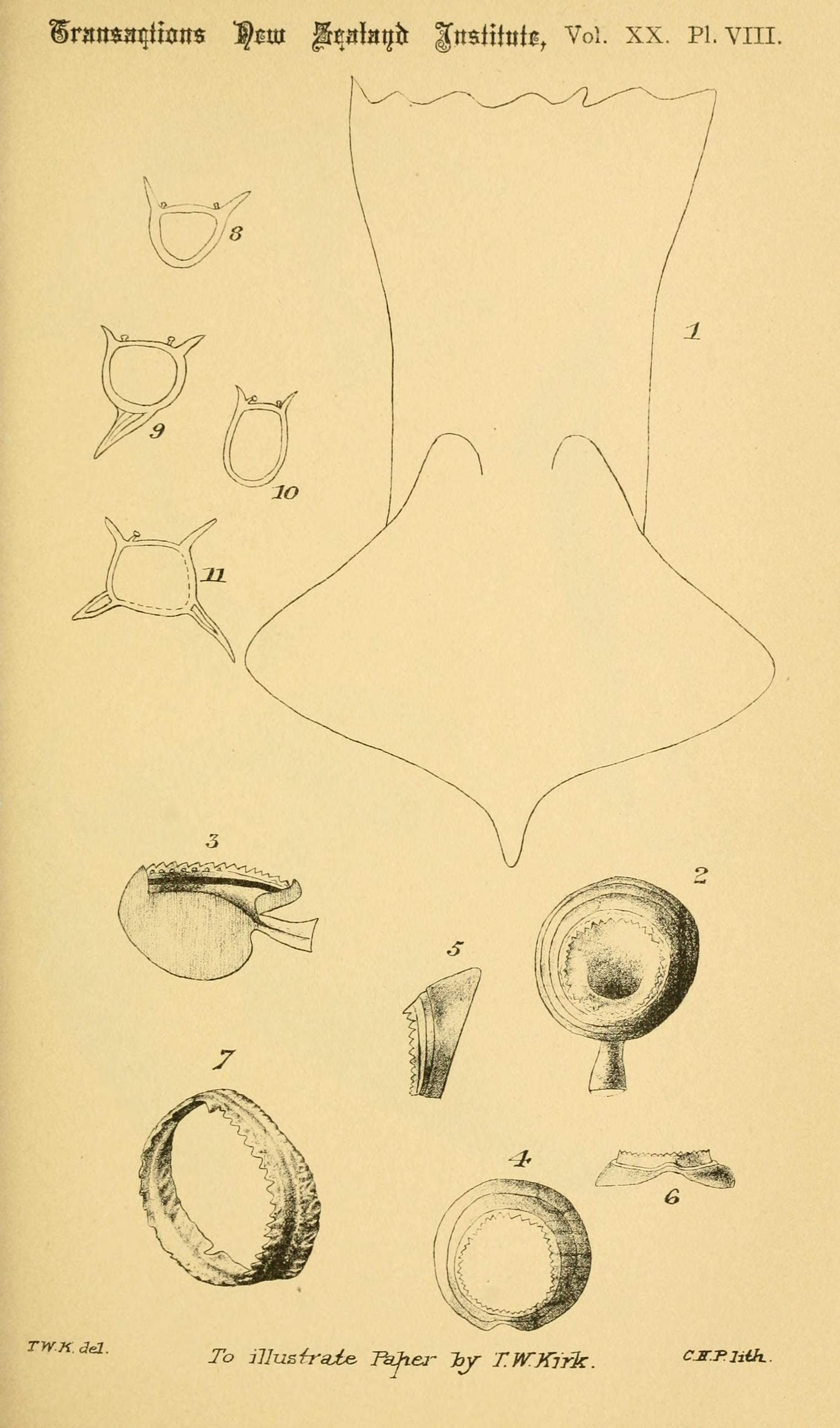
#62 (?/10/1887)
Illustration of the A. longimanus specimen by T. W. Kirk, showing the posterior end of the mantle (including caudal fins), details of arm and tentacular suckers, and transverse sections of arms I–IV (Kirk, 1888:pl. 8)

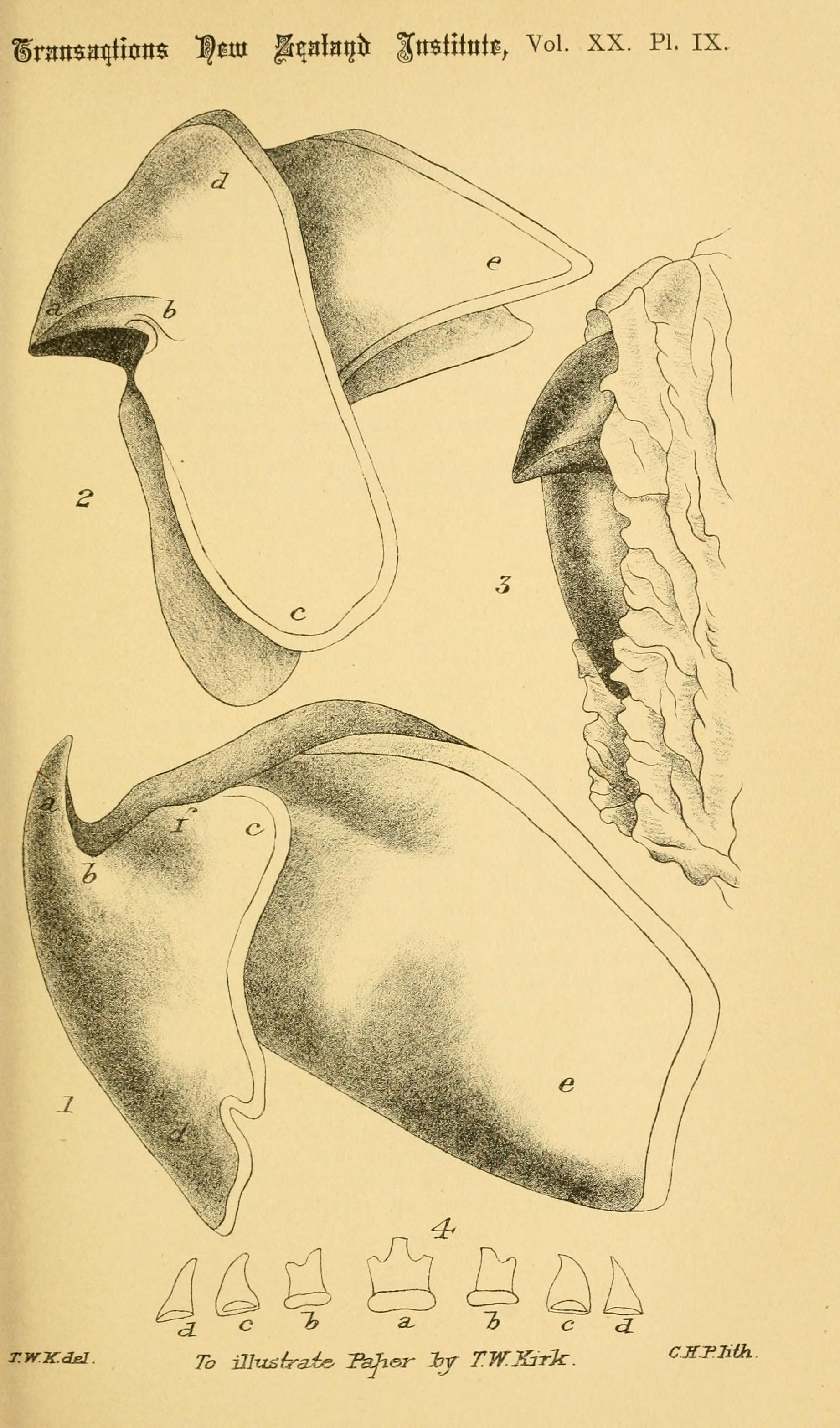
#62 (?/10/1887)
T. W. Kirk's final plate of A. longimanus, showing the two-part beak (both in situ and following extraction) and a single row of radular teeth (Kirk, 1888:pl. 9)

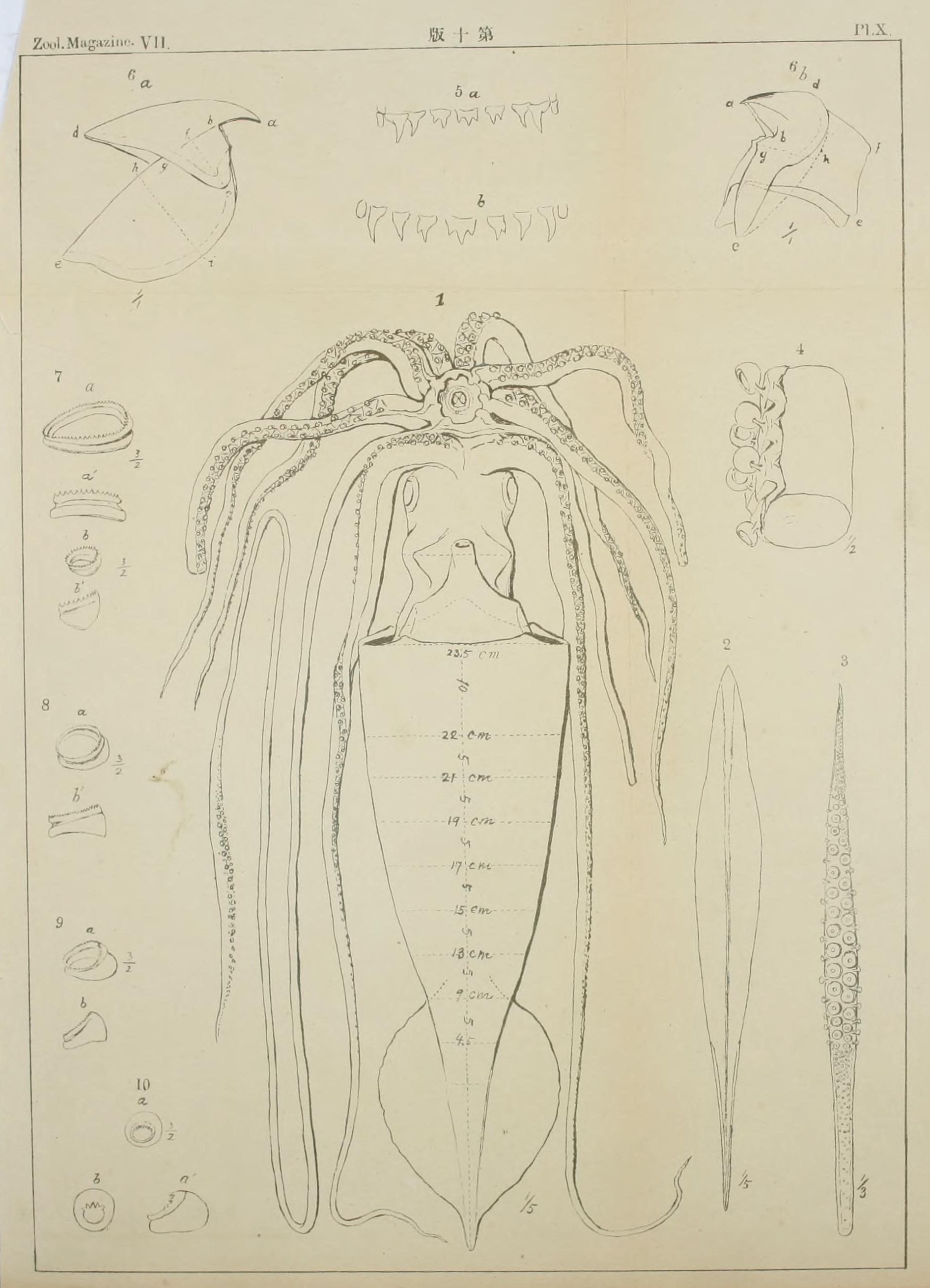
#67 (4/2/1895)
Type specimen of Architeuthis japonica, caught in a net in Tokyo Bay on 4 February 1895 after a 2–3 day storm (Mitsukuri & Ikeda, 1895:pl. 10)

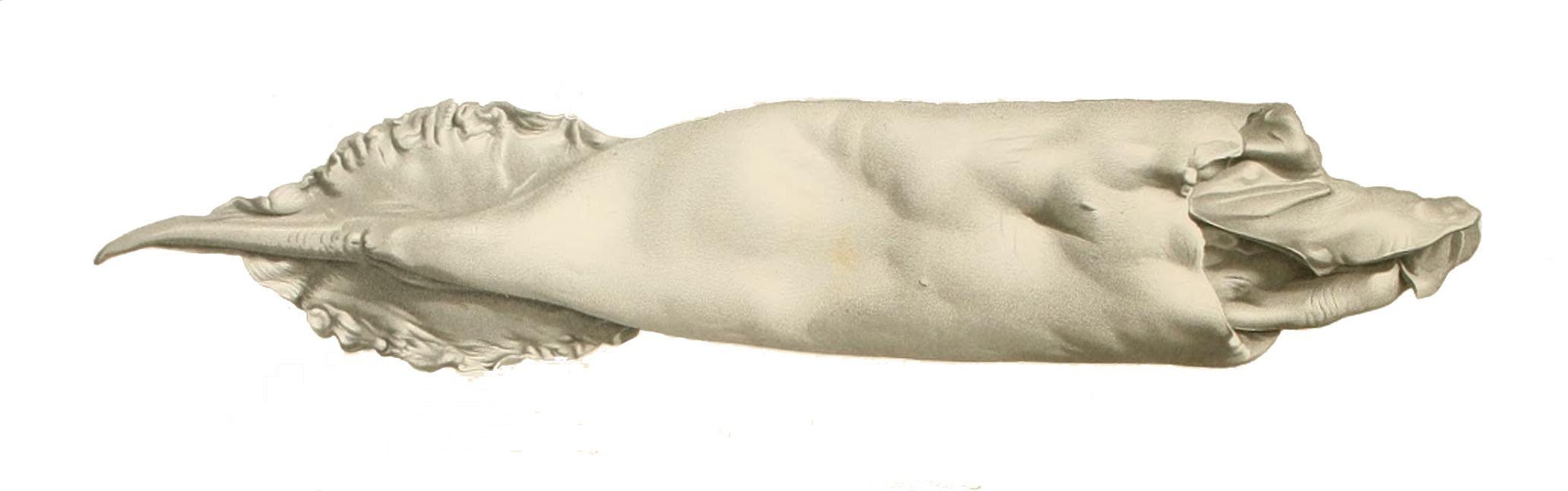
#68 (18/7/1895)
Mantle measuring 46 cm originally recovered from sperm whale vomit, from a 1900 work by Louis Joubin (Joubin, 1900:pl. 15 fig. 8). This specimen is the holotype of Dubioteuthis physeteris.

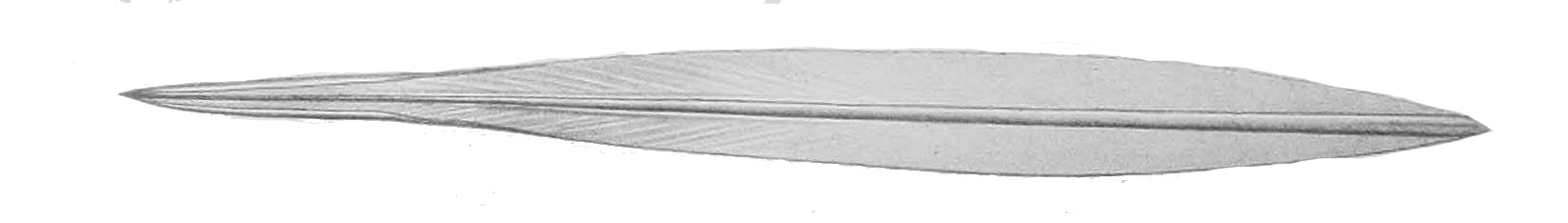
#68 (18/7/1895)
Gladius (internal shell remnant) measuring 39 cm extracted from the same specimen (Joubin, 1900:pl. 15 fig. 10)

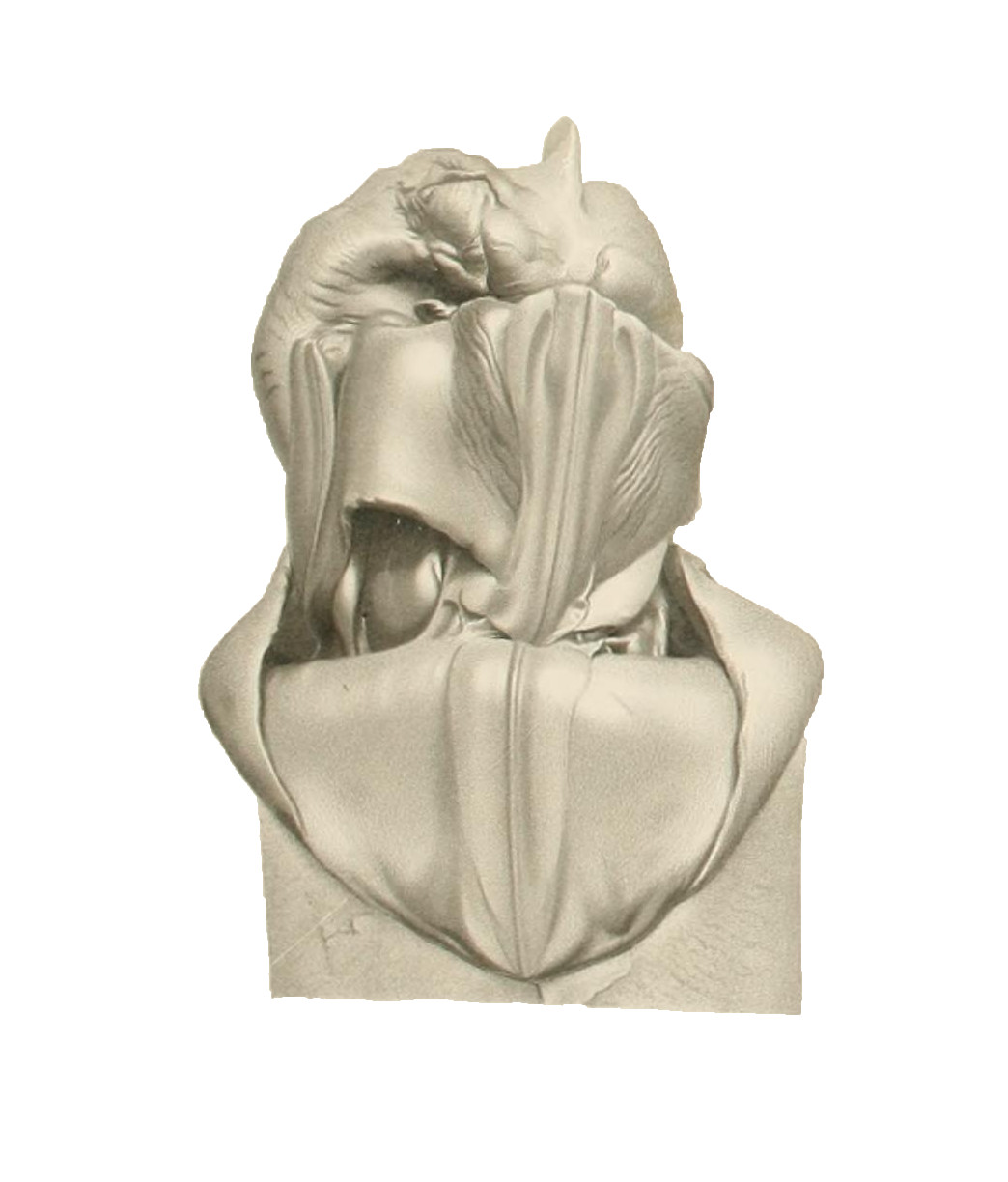
#68 (18/7/1895)
Detail of the dorsal anterior mantle of the Dubioteuthis physeteris holotype (Joubin, 1900:pl. 15 fig. 9)

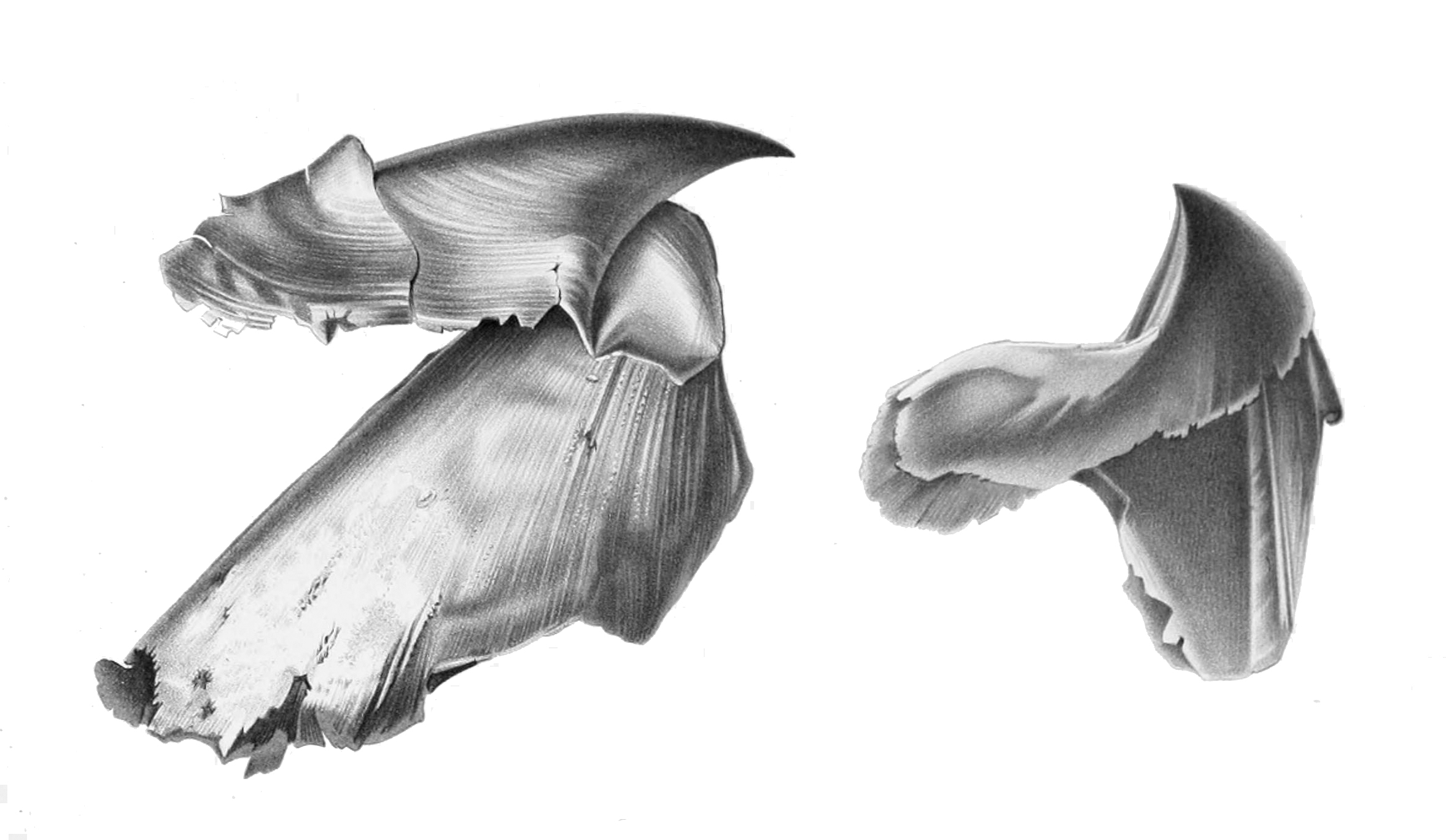
#[3] (18/7/1895)
Two-part beak of an undetermined squid (Joubin, 1900:pl. 14 figs. 1–2), identified as possibly Architeuthis by Joubin (1900) and as non-architeuthid by Pfeffer (1912)

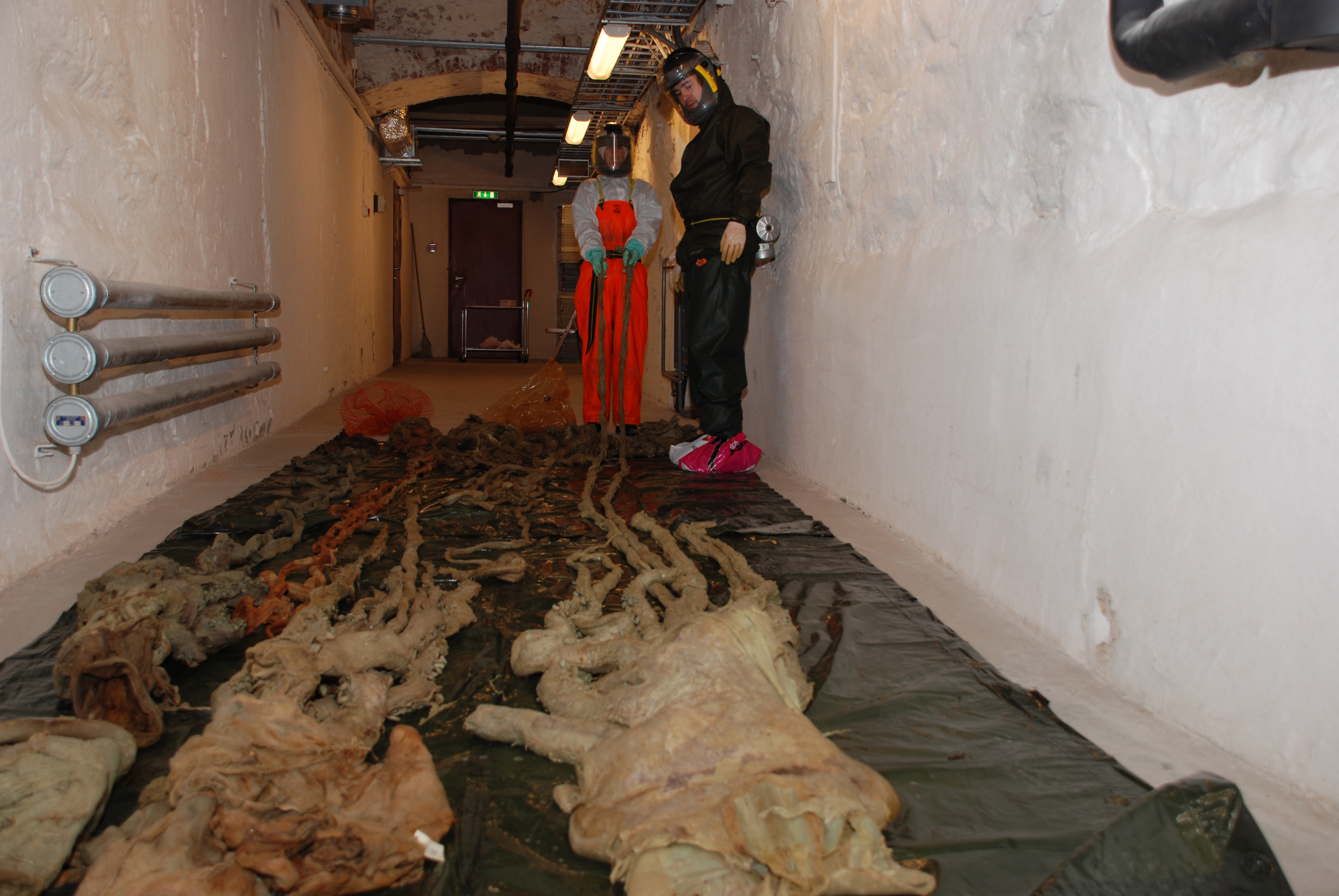
#69 (10/4/1896) and others
Three giant squid from the NTNU Museum of Natural History and Archaeology in Trondheim, Norway, including the oldest and largest specimen (#69), which was found in 1896 and measures some 12 m (39 ft) in total length

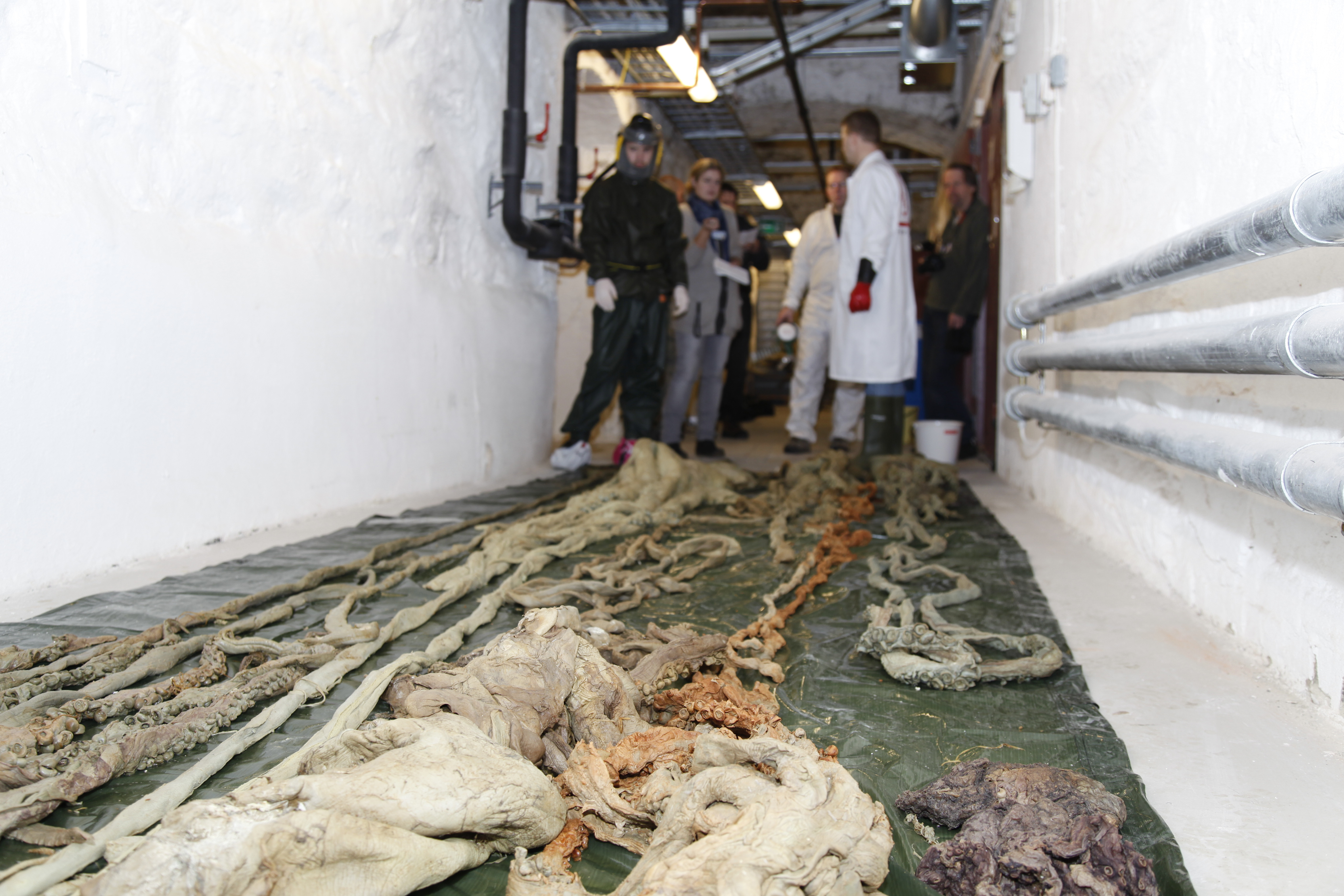
#69 (10/4/1896) and others
View from the other end of the corridor, showing the tentacles of the three more-or-less complete specimens and various other assorted giant squid parts (see also tentacular club being examined)

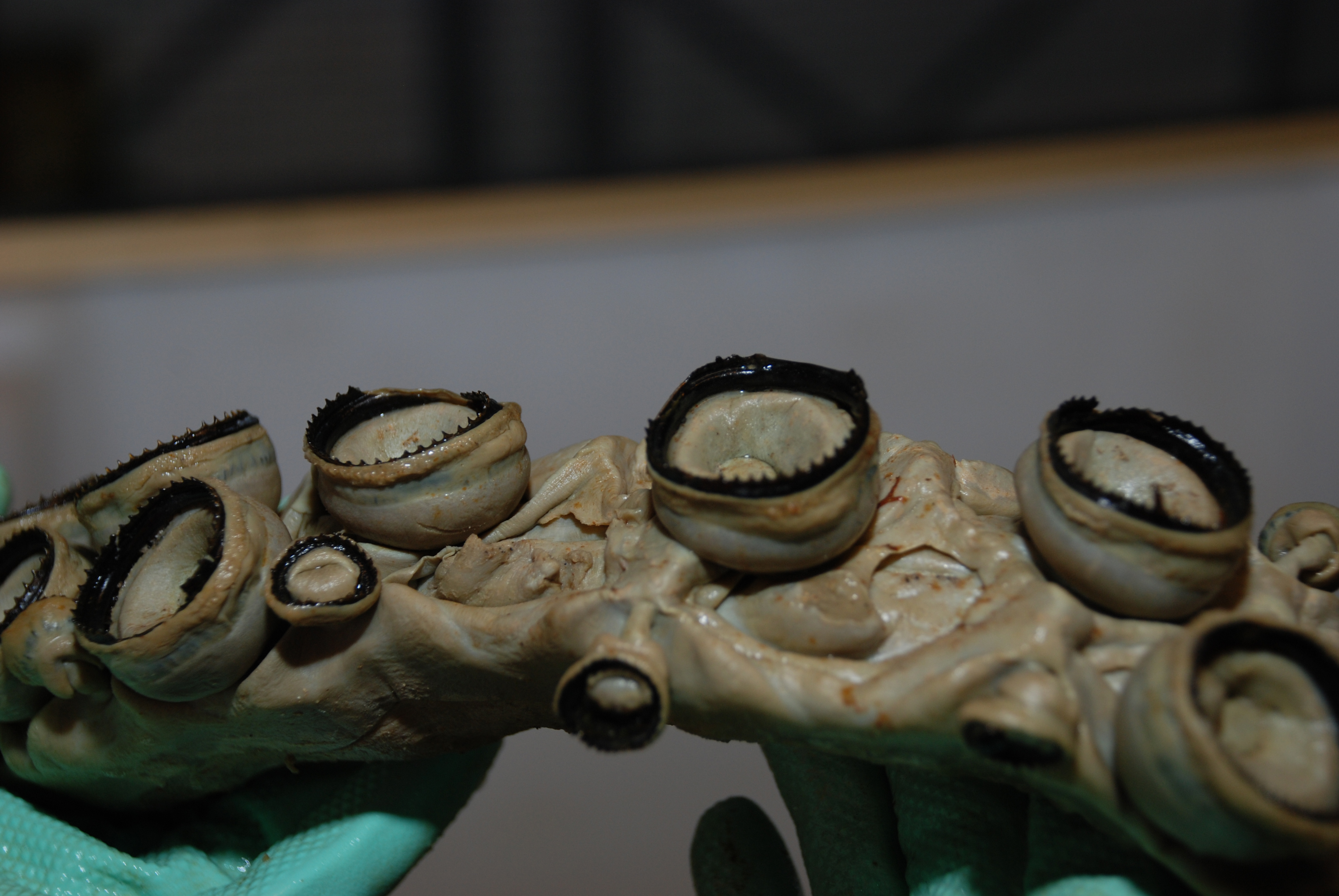
#69 (10/4/1896)
Tentacular suckers of the largest specimen, examined in 2011, when the box containing the museum's six giant squid was reopened for maintenance, registration in the database, and to add new preservatives.

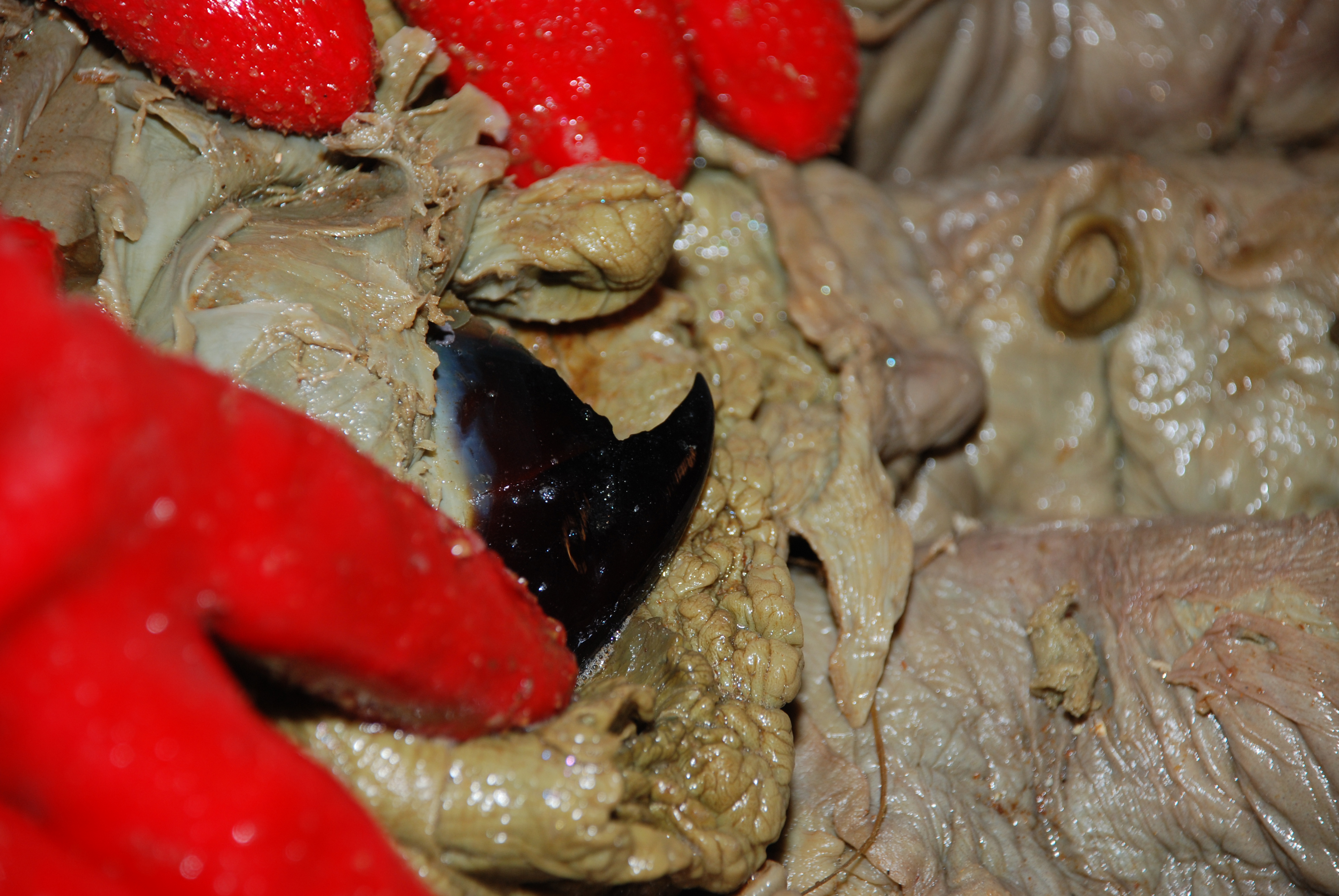
#69 (10/4/1896)
Beak of the same specimen, as it appeared during the 2011 inspection

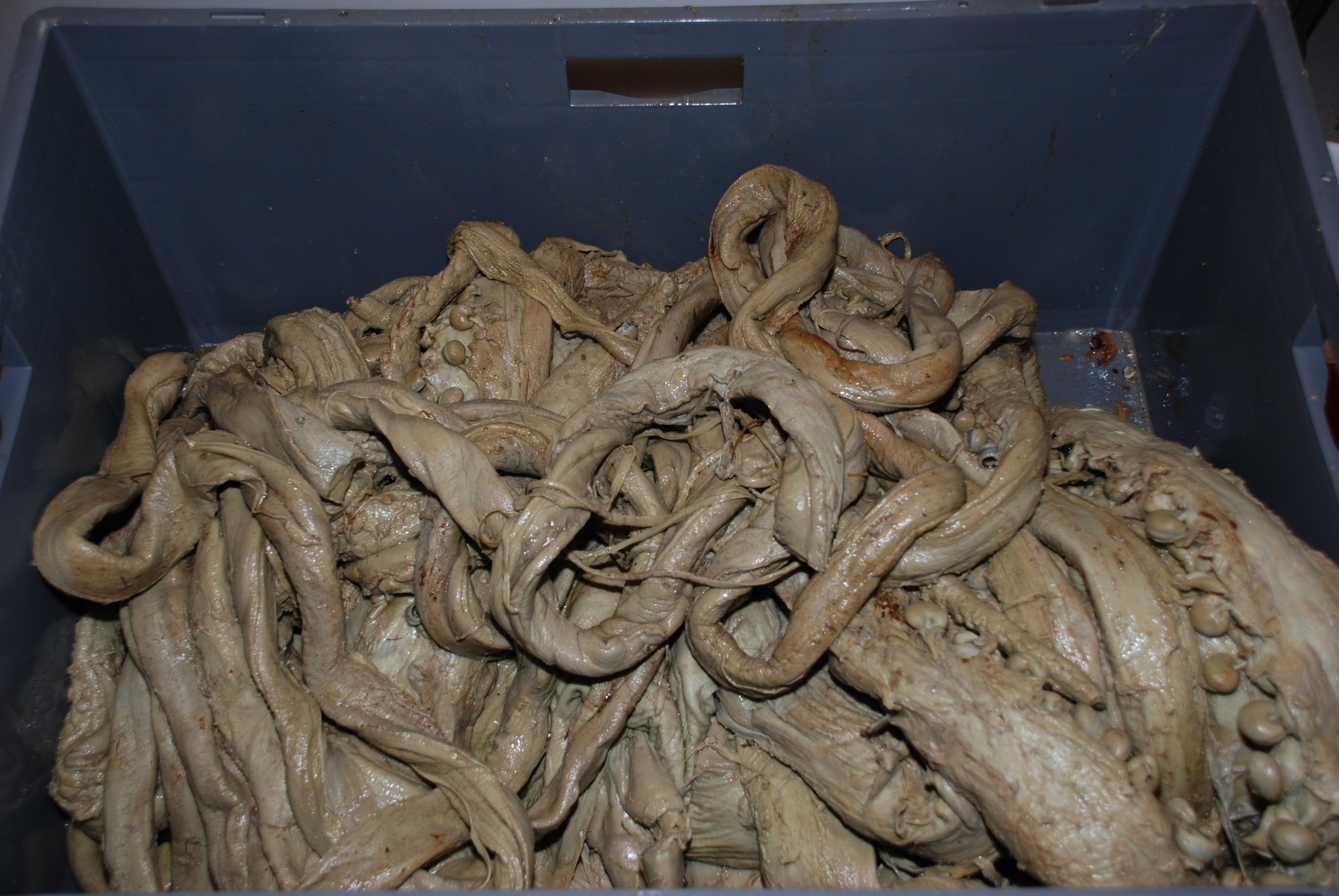
?#69 (10/4/1896) and others
Assorted arms and tentacles of several old giant squid specimens from the NTNU Museum of Natural History and Archaeology (see also before and during removal from box, and details of tentacular club)

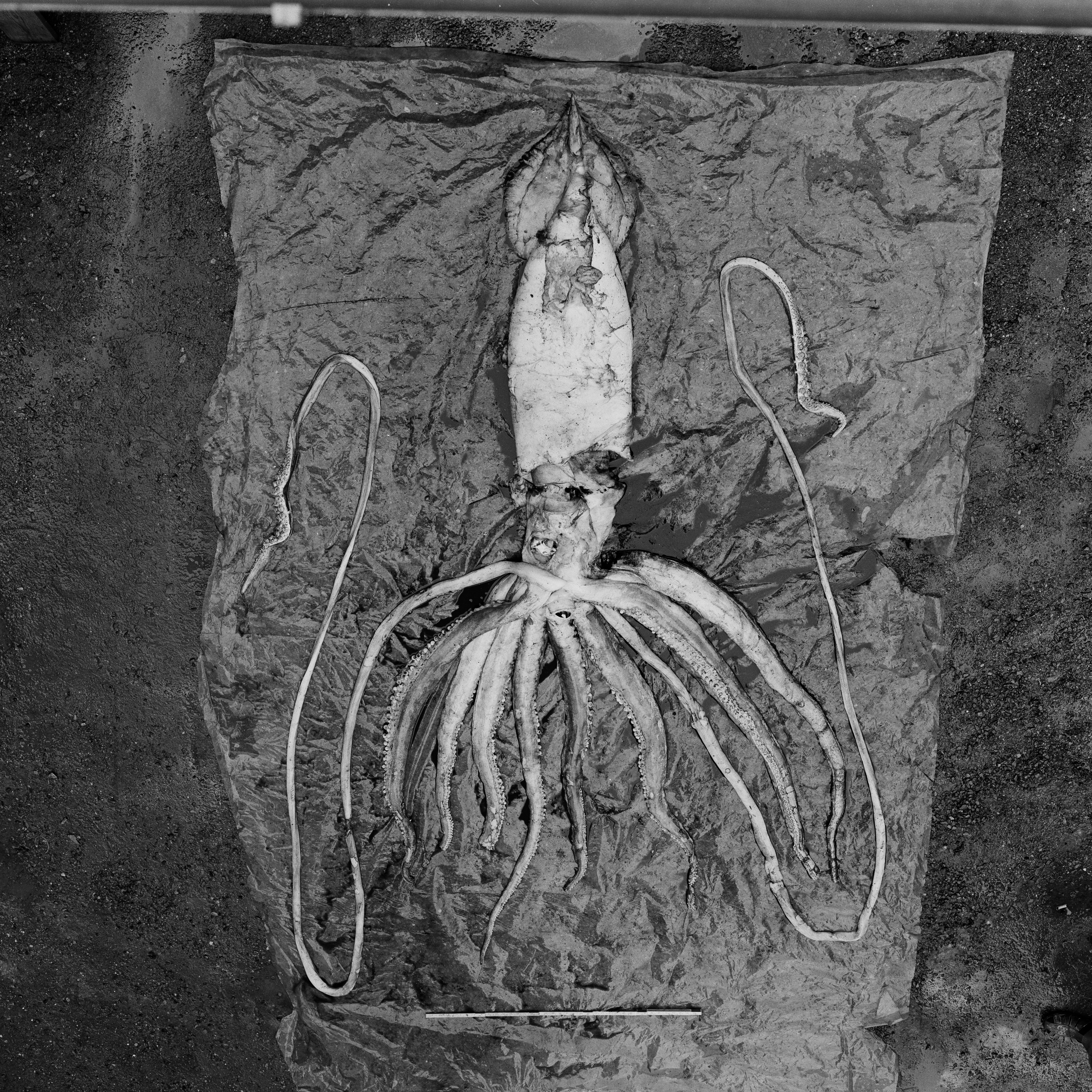
#69 (10/4/1896) or #70 (27/9/1896)
One of the two giant specimens from Kyrksæterøra, stretched out for measurement

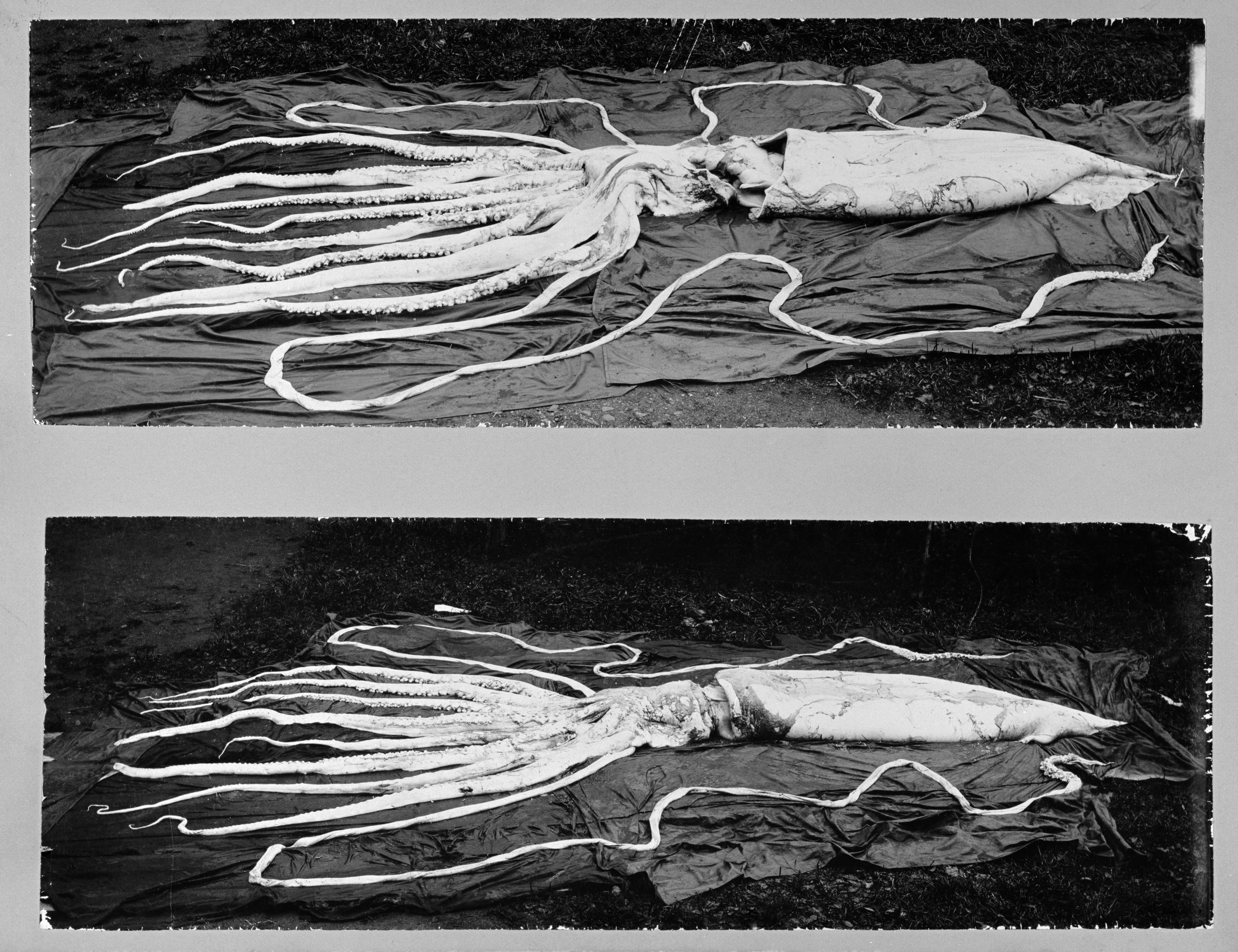
#70 (27/9/1896)
Ventral (top) and dorsal views of the second 1896 specimen from Kyrksæterøra. The present copy was released by the NTNU Museum of Natural History and Archaeology in 2011; lower-resolution versions originally appeared in Storm (1897:100, fig. 20) and Brinkmann (1916:179, fig. 2).

== Notes ==
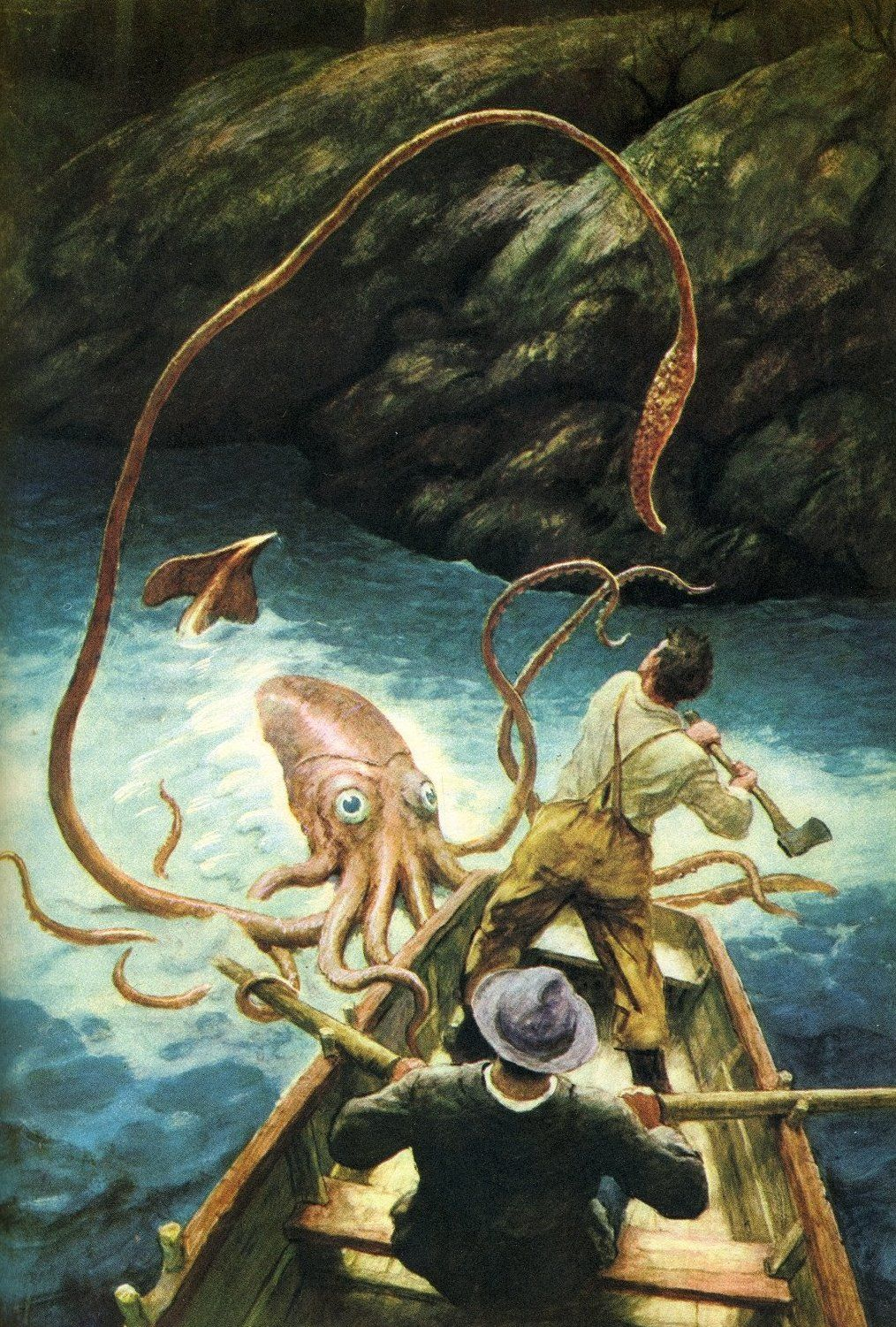
Though fictional accounts often depict giant squid attacking boats (cf. #29), live animals found at the surface are almost invariably sick or dying, and no injuries resulting from such encounters have ever been documented.

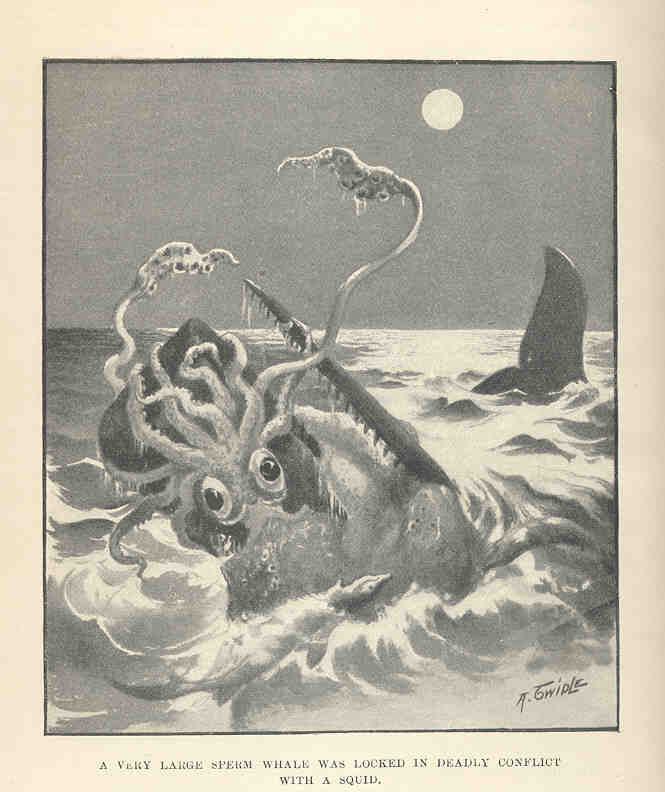
The surface encounter between a sperm whale and a giant squid supposedly witnessed by Frank Thomas Bullen, from his semi-autobiographical travel narrative The Cruise of the Cachalot, first published in 1898

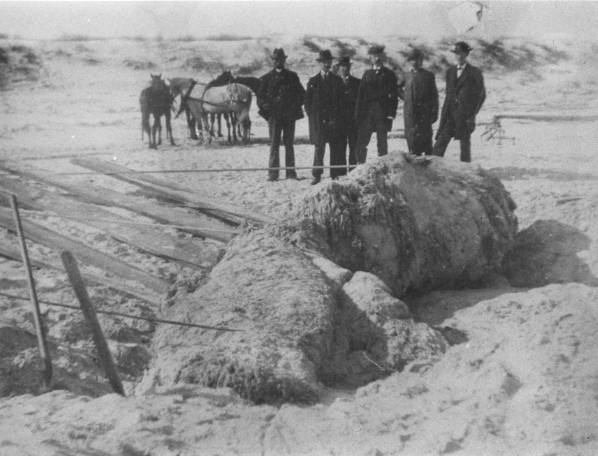

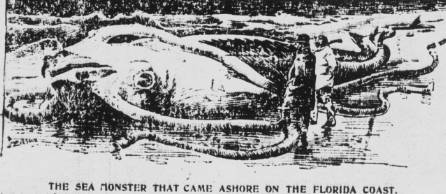
Top: The so-called St. Augustine Monster of 1896, which A. E. Verrill briefly considered "perhaps a species of Architeuthis" but was later shown to be the remains of a whale
Bottom: A fanciful depiction of the Florida carcass as a tentacled sea monster, from the Pennsylvania Grit of 13 December 1896

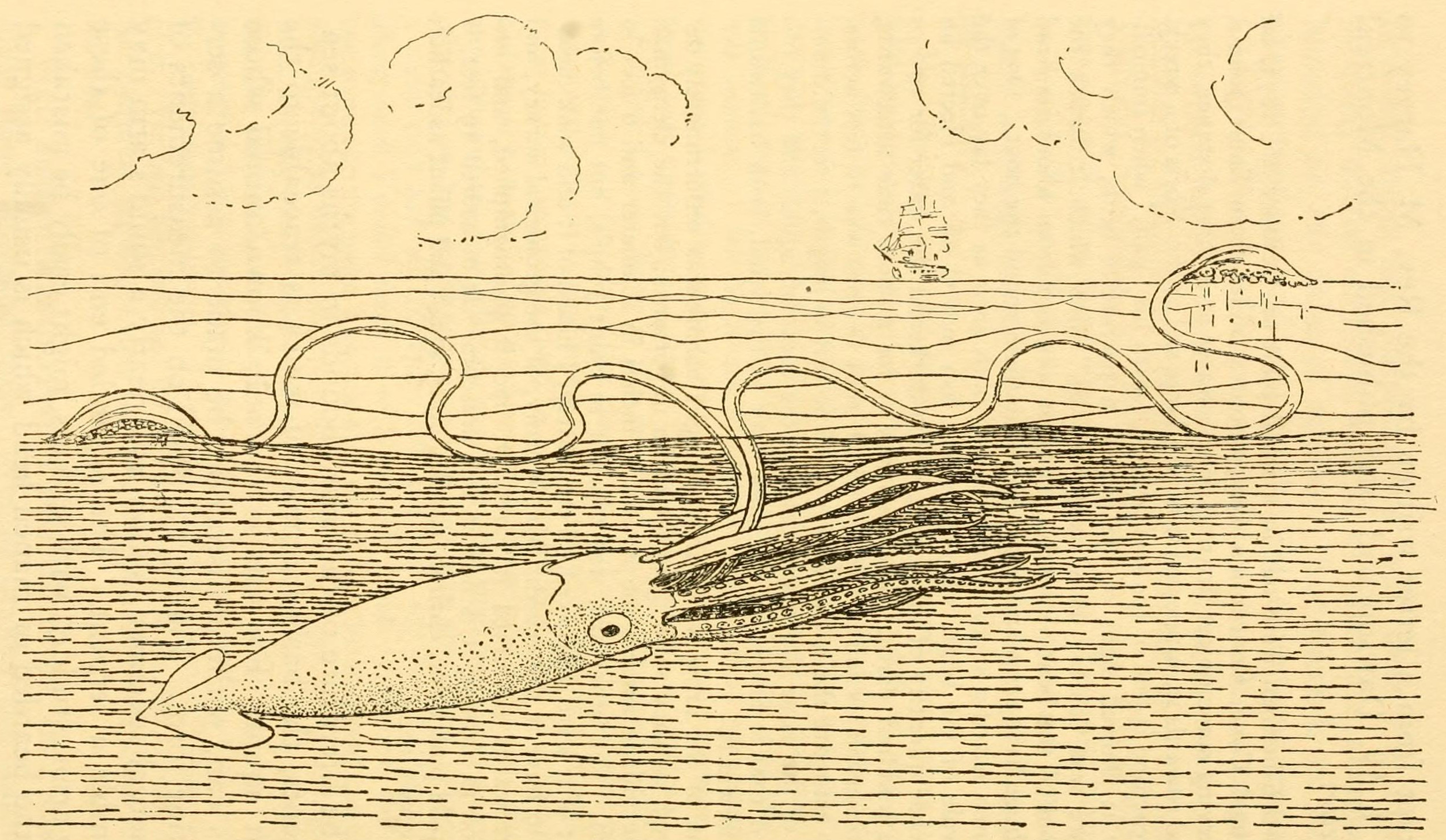
Paul Bartsch, longtime curator of molluscs at the National Museum of Natural History, believed that most reports of sea serpents were based on sightings of giant squid, particularly ones holding their tentacles above the water (see also alternative image)

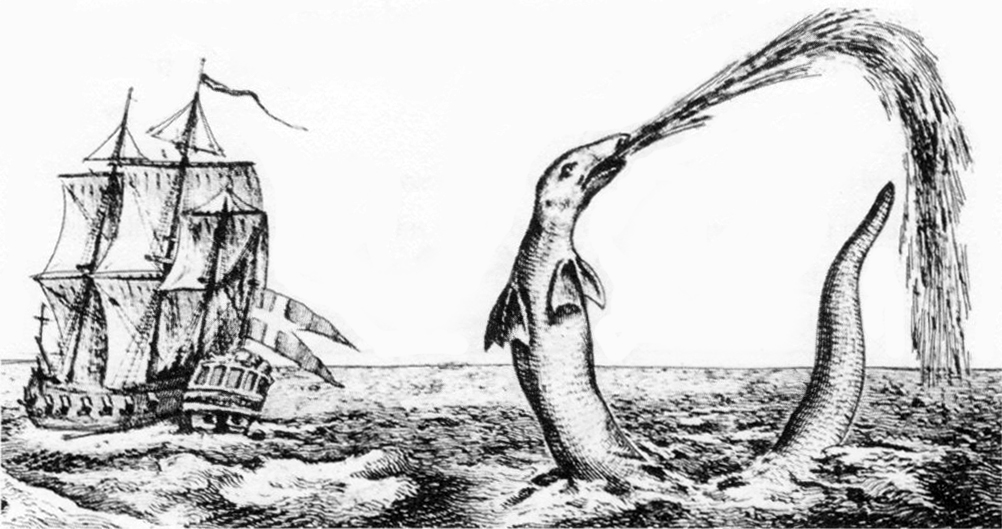

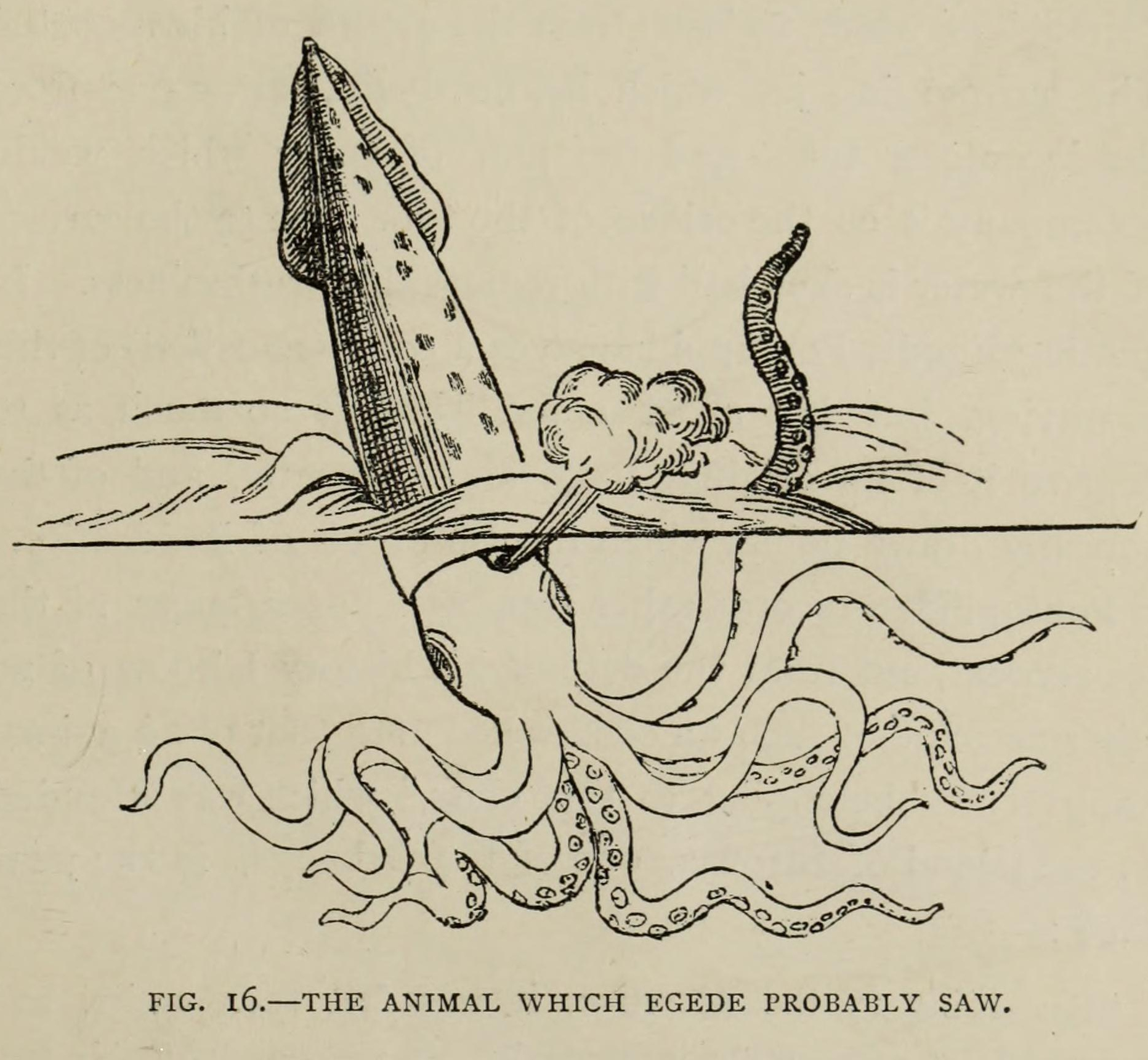
Top: Hans Egede's "most dreadful monster", reportedly seen off Greenland in 1734.
Bottom: Henry Lee proposed the giant squid as an explanation (Lee, 1883:64, fig. 16). Paxton et al. (2005) suggested it might have been a male cetacean in a state of arousal.
