= List of giant squid specimens and sightings (20th century) =

This much-reproduced photograph shows a giant squid found at Ranheim in Trondheimsfjord, Norway, on 2 October 1954 (#136 on this list), being examined by Professors Erling Sivertsen and Svein Haftorn. The unusually complete specimen measured 9.24 metres (30.3 ft) in total length and had a mantle length of 1.79 metres (5 ft 10 in). Specimens such as this, if properly preserved, can provide important scientific data long after they are collected; the animal pictured had its beak morphometrics and tentacle morphology studied by Roeleveld (2000) and Roeleveld (2002), respectively.

This list of giant squid specimens and sightings from the 20th century is a comprehensive timeline of human encounters with members of the genus Architeuthis, popularly known as giant squid. It includes animals that were caught by fishermen, found washed ashore, recovered (in whole or in part) from sperm whales and other predatory species, as well as those reliably sighted at sea. The list also covers specimens incorrectly assigned to the genus Architeuthis in original descriptions or later publications.

== Background ==
Compilation of published coordinates for 20th century specimens (some may be subject to significant rounding error and even indicate inland locations) Download coordinates as: KML

The frequency of documented giant squid encounters greatly increased throughout the 20th century, providing much insight into the species's biology and life history. It was found that giant squid are preyed upon not only by sperm whales but by a wide range of other animals, including albacore (#193), lancetfish (#149 and 164; see #48 for 19th century record), swordfish (#232), blue sharks (#215 and 375), Portuguese dogfish (#203), shortfin mako sharks (#205 and 431), sleeper sharks (#396, 405, 430, 432, and 433), and northern elephant seals (#279 and 332). One specimen taken alive by troll was reportedly attacked by a false killer whale during retrieval (#247).

Observations of live and freshly dead animals also revealed new aspects of giant squid behaviour, including rapid colour change (#254 and 391) and high-speed swimming at the surface (#106), though the veracity of the latter observation has been questioned. Additionally, examinations of dead specimens and partial remains provided data on diet (#226 and 412), longevity and habitat (#369, 371, and 374), depth of occurrence and buoyancy (#246 and 266), metabolism and locomotory ability (#411), as well as tentacle regeneration and internal parasites (#169). New preservation methods, including plastination (#429), were also trialled.

The large-scale commercial exploitation of sperm whales, particularly from the end of World War II to the 1970s, provided a rich source of giant squid remains for scientific study. The vast majority of these consisted of disarticulated beaks (with up to 47 found in a single sperm whale stomach; #331), though more substantial remains were occasionally recovered, including even whole adult specimens (#84, 128, 137, 151, 209, 225, and 234), with one reportedly showing signs of life after being vomited (#128). The most important figure in the study of ingested giant squid remains was marine biologist Malcolm Clarke, who authored around a dozen relevant papers.

Following the flurry of new giant squid species descriptions that characterised the latter half of the 19th century, the 20th century saw only three newly erected species: Architeuthis japonica by Pfeffer (1912:27), based on a specimen caught in Tokyo Bay in 1895 (#67); Architeuthis clarkei by Robson (1933), based on a carcass that washed ashore in Scarborough, England, earlier that year (#107); and Architeuthis nawaji by Cadenat (1935), based on a specimen caught in the Bay of Biscay the same year (#110). The consensus today is that there exists only a single, globally distributed species of giant squid: Architeuthis dux.

The second half of the 20th century saw the first serious efforts to photograph or film a live giant squid. Beginning in the late 1980s, most of these early attempts were led by either Frederick Aldrich or Clyde Roper, the two foremost giant squid experts of their time. However, it would not be until the first years of the 21st century that this milestone was finally achieved. (Note: Though see specimen #323 from Tottori Prefecture, Japan, which was reportedly still alive when found stranded in shallow water on 16 April 1988, where it was photographed in situ.)

== List of giant squid ==
Misidentification (non-architeuthid) Record encompassing multiple specimens Photographed or filmed while alive

#	Date	Location	Nature of encounter	Identification	Material cited	Material saved	Sex	Size and measurements	Repository	Main references	Additional references	Notes
72 (📷)	1902	north of Faroe Islands, Atlantic Ocean {NEA}	Found floating at surface, dead	?Architeuthis dux Steenstrup, 1857	Entire, very bad condition	Entire		BL+HL: 76 cm; ML: 63 cm; MW: 15 cm; FL: 26.7 cm; FW: 8 cm; TL: 214 cm; ASD: 8 mm; TSD: 11 mm	Bergen Museum [=ZMUB?]	Murray & Hjort (1912:651, fig. 484); Grieg (1933:20)	Broch (1954:151)	Young specimen taken by Michael Sars.
73 (📷)	15 August 1903	whaling station in Mjofjord, east coast of Iceland {NEA}	From sperm whale stomach	Architeuthis dux Steenstrup, 1857	Tentacle (partial), arm	Tentacle (from mouth of whale)		TD: 17 cm; ?AL: 6 m	Bergen Museum [=ZMUB?]	Murray & Hjort (1912:651); Grieg (1933:21)		Length of arm given by whalers who witnessed whale regurgitating it in "death-flurry". Whale's head bore "long parallel stripes" consisting of putative giant squid sucker scars c. 27 mm across; numerous squid beaks up to 9 cm long found in stomach.
74	July 1906	?, Norway {NEA}	From sperm whale stomach	Architeuthis sp.						Collett (1912:635)		
75	1907	?, Norway {NEA}	From sperm whale stomach	Architeuthis sp.						Collett (1912:635)		
76	March 1909	off Highland Light, Truro, Massachusetts {NWA}	Not stated; floating at surface?	Architeuthis sp.	Entire	None		AL: 7 ft 6 in (2.29 m); ?WL: ~16–17 ft (4.9–5.2 m); AD: 4 in (10 cm)	None	Blake (1909:43)		Found by schooner Annie Perry; attempted to be hoisted aboard but cut in half by rope; tentacle [arm] saved but later discarded.
77	July 1909	?, Norway {NEA}	From sperm whale stomach	Architeuthis sp.						Collett (1912:635)		
78	September 1910	off coast of County Mayo, Ireland {NEA}	From two sperm whale stomachs	Architeuthis sp.	Two upper beaks and eye lens(es)	Entire?		None	NMI catalog no. 1912.75.1 (possibly also 1995.16.484)	Massy (1913:2); Nunn & Holmes (2008); Sigwart & Leonard (2009:96)		Collected by Captain Bruun from two sperm whale stomachs per Massy (1913), but specimen label indicates a single sperm whale and gives donor name as E.W.L. Holt. Stored dry. A second Architeuthis accession (NMI 1995.16.484), which lacks an acquisition date but is labelled "Beak and eye of Cuttlefish from stomach of sperm whale. Blacksod Bay [in County Mayo]. Given by H.C. Hartnell.", may represent the remains from the second sperm whale stomach reported by Massy (1913); based on its label this specimen appears to date from the late 19th to early 20th century.
79	1910/1911? (autumn)	Lundenes, Grytøya, Senjen, Norway {NEA}	Found washed ashore	Architeuthis dux Steenstrup, 1857	Entire	None		WL: 1.2 m		Brinkmann (1916:178); Grieg (1933:20)	Nordgård (1928:71); Sivertsen (1955:11)	
80	June 1911	Monterey Bay, California, United States {NEP}	Floating at surface, dead	Unidentified; Architeuthis?	Entire; "in very bad condition, there was no color left, and the epidermis had all sloughed off"	None		EL: >30 ft (9.1 m)		Berry (1912:117)		
81 (📷)	February 1912	Veiholmen, Smøla, Norway {NEA}	Found in shallow water	Architeuthis dux Steenstrup, 1857	Entire	Entire		BL: 1.9 m; TL: 6.7 m	Kristiansund Museum	Brinkmann (1916:180, fig. 3); Grieg (1933:20)	Nordgård (1928:71); Sivertsen (1955:11)	
82	1912	Japan {NWP}						Unknown		Pfeffer (1912)	Ellis (1998a:260)	
83	12 October 1912	Monterey Bay, California, United States {NEP}	Not indicated	Unidentified; Architeuthis?	Entire	None		WT: ~500 lb (230 kg)		Berry (1914:22)		Observed by Mr. K. Hovden (Manager, Booth Canning Company, Monterey). Supposedly eaten raw by Italian fishermen who "captured" it; considered highly doubtful given ammonium chloride present in giant squid tissues.
84	18 July 1913	Belmullet whaling station, Ireland {NEA}	From sperm whale stomach	Architeuthis harveyi (Kent, 1874)	Entire, plus other parts	Tip of tentacle; beak and radula; other dry beaks plus portion of gladius		ML: 6 ft (1.8 m); BC: 4 ft (1.2 m); AL: 6 ft (1.8 m); TL: 21 ft (6.4 m); FL: 1 ft 7 in (0.48 m); FW: 1 ft 9.5 in (0.546 m)	Undetermined; University of Liverpool?	Hamilton (1915:137, 147); Hardy (1956:286); Collins (1998a:489)	Rees (1950:40)	From 57 ft 3 in (17.45 m) male sperm whale (no. 22) examined by J.E. Hamilton.
85 (📷)	22 November 1915 [or 21 November]	Lerøya, Austrheim Municipality (north of Bergen), Norway {NEA}	Found washed ashore	Architeuthis dux Steenstrup, 1857	Entire	Initially entire [head and viscera]	Male [immature female]	ML+HL: 1550 mm; ML: 1310 mm; BD: 440 mm; HW: 310 mm; FL: 430 mm; FW: 105; AL(I): 1780 mm; AL(IV): 1640 mm; TL: 5600 mm [TL: 4925 mm [right]]; CL: 745 mm [right]; CSC: 262 [right]; TSC: 287 [right]; LRL: 15.8 mm; URL: 15.9 mm; additional beak measurements, indices, and counts	ZMUB; ZMUB 43689 [specimen NA-12 of Roeleveld (2000) and Roeleveld (2002)]	Brinkmann (1916:175, fig. 1); Grieg (1933:17); Roeleveld (2000:185); Roeleveld (2002:727)	Nordgård (1928:71); Sivertsen (1955:11); Toll & Hess (1981b:754)	Plaster cast made of specimen also in Bergen Museum. Beak morphometrics studied by Roeleveld (2000). Tentacle morphology examined by Roeleveld (2002).
86	17 March 1916	Hellandsjo, west of Hevnefjord, Norway {NEA}	Found washed ashore, alive	Architeuthis dux Steenstrup, 1857	Entire	A little of the front part, tentacles and arms; remainder used for bait		TL: 6.2 m	VSM	Brinkmann (1916:180); Grieg (1933:20)	Nordgård (1923:11); Nordgård (1928:71); Sivertsen (1955:11)	With sucker response when found by J.F. Vaagan.
87	November 1916	Oyvag, Dønna, Helgeland, Atlantic Ocean {NEA}	Found washed ashore	Architeuthis dux Steenstrup, 1857	Entire?	None		None		Grieg (1933:20)		
88	29 October 1917	Skateraw, Berwickshire, Scotland (55°58.5′N 02°25′W) {NEA}	Found washed ashore	Architeuthis harveyi (Kent, 1874); Architeuthis dux Steenstrup, 1857	Entire	Club and gladius fragment		BL+HL: 5 ft 9 in (1.75 m); FW: 19 in (48 cm); AL: 4 ft (1.2 m); AC: 9.5 in (24 cm); TL: 13 ft 10 in (4.22 m); CL: 2 ft 6 in (0.76 m); other measurements and description	NMSZ catalog no. 1917.54.1–2	Ritchie (1918:133); Ritchie (1922:423); Robson (1933:692); Heppell & Smith (1983:35)	Stephen (1944:264); Rees (1950:40); Stephen (1962:154); Collins (1998a:489)	Observations by J. Ritchie after earlier mutilation of specimen by local boys. Colour drawing by Ritchie in NMSZ.
89 (📷)	10 January 1918	reportedly caught in Awa Province; Tokyo fishmarket, Japan {NWP}	Not stated	Architeuthis japonica Pfeffer, 1912	Entire	Undetermined	Male (mature)	ML: 1100 mm; BC: 800 mm; FL: 400 mm; FW: 320 mm; GL: 1040 mm		Sasaki (1929:224, pl. 20 figs. 1–11); Heuvelmans (1968)	Toll & Hess (1981b:753)	
90	1918	Kilkel, County Clare, Ireland {NEA}	Found washed ashore	Architeuthis sp.	Not specified	Undetermined		None		Hardy (1956:286)	Collins (1998a:489)	
91	November 1919	Oyvag of Dønna, off coast of Nordland, Norway {NEA}	Not stated	Architeuthis dux	Entire?	Undetermined		None		Nordgård (1923:11)	Nordgård (1928:71); Sivertsen (1955:11, fig. 4)	
92	February 1920	Vallay, North Uist, Outer Hebrides, Scotland {NEA}	Found washed ashore	Architeuthis or Sthenoteuthis; Architeuthis dux Steenstrup, 1857	Entire	None		"Length of squid": 3.5–4 ft (1.1–1.2 m); AL: ~1 ft (0.30 m)		Ritchie (1920:57)	Stephen (1944:264); Rees (1950:40); Stephen (1962:154); Collins (1998a:489)	Information from Mr. G. Beveridge.
93	1921	Wick, Moray Firth, Scotland {NEA}	Not stated	Architeuthis dux	Beak and sucker ring, dry	Sucker ring; beak lost, photograph only extant		None	NMSZ	Heppell & Smith (1983:33)	Collins (1998a:489)	
94 (📷)	1922	Caithness, North of Scotland {NEA}	Found washed ashore	Architeuthis harveyi (Kent, 1874); Architeuthis dux Steenstrup, 1857	Not specified	Undetermined		None	NMSZ	Ritchie (1922:423); Robson (1933:692)	Stephen (1944:264); Rees (1950:40); Hardy (1956:287); Stephen (1962:154)	
95	1924	Margate, Natal {SIO}							Unknown	Heuvelmans (1968)	Ellis (1998a:260)	
96	9 ?October 1924	Bluff, New Zealand {SWP}	Not stated			Undetermined		BL: 7 ft (2.1 m); "spread of tentacles": 18 ft (5.5 m)		Dell (1952:98)	The New Zealand Herald 9 October 1924	
97	Unknown (prior to spring 1926)	Urago Bay, Oki Islands, Japan {NWP}	Not stated	?Architeuthis sp.	Entire	Undetermined		None		Hamabe (1957); Nishimura (1968:75)		Capture date prior to spring 1926.
98	1926 (early spring)	off Kuniga, Oki Islands, Japan {NWP}	Not stated	?Architeuthis sp.	Entire	Undetermined		None		Hamabe (1957); Nishimura (1968:75)		
99	1926	Wingan Inlet, Victoria, Australia {SWP}	Found washed ashore	Architeuthis kirkii Robson, 1887	Entire	Undetermined		None		MacPherson & Gabriel (1962:413)		
100	13 December 1927	Kalveidøy, Fitjar, Norway {NEA}	Found washed ashore	Architeuthis dux Steenstrup, 1857	Entire	None		BL: 1 m; TL: 6.5 m		Grieg (1933:19)	Sivertsen (1955:11)	
101 (📷)	4 March 1928	Ranheim (about 8 km east of Trondheim), Norway {NEA}	Found washed ashore	Architeuthis dux Steenstrup, 1857	Entire	Entire	Male	?EL: ~7.9 m; ML: 1.37 m; AL: 1.4–1.5 m; TL: 6.4 m; LRL: 15.0 mm; URL: 13.7 mm; additional beak measurements	VSM; VSM 108a [specimen NA-19 of Roeleveld (2000)]	Nordgård (1928:70, text-fig.); Grieg (1933:20); Roeleveld (2000:185)	Sivertsen (1955:5); Aldrich (1991:476)	Spermatophores present. Beak morphometrics studied by Roeleveld (2000).
102	1928 (?)	off western Greenland (~67°N) {NWA}	Not stated	Architeuthis sp.	Jaws only	Undetermined		None		Muus (1962:20, 22)	Ellis (1998a:260)	Seen by members of the Godthaab Expedition. Very northerly record; "must be considered occasional guests from more southerly latitudes".
103	24 January 1930	Gullane, East Lothian, Scotland (56°02.5′N 02°51′W) {NEA}	Found washed ashore	Architeuthis dux Steenstrup, 1857	Entire	Undetermined		BL+HL: 1803 mm; HL: 381 mm; HC: 711 mm; ML: 1422 mm; BC: 1143 mm [at mantle edge]; additional measurements	NSMZ catalog no. 1930.174. Stephen specimen No. 1	Stephen (1962:151); Heppell & Smith (1983:34)	Collins (1998a:489)	Data from unpublished Ritchie manuscript; see Heppell & Smith (1983) concerning locality data.
104	1930?	Goose Bay, Kaikōura, New Zealand {SWP}	Not stated		Entire	Undetermined		BL: 11 ft (3.4 m); AL[TL?]: ~30 ft (9.1 m)		Dell (1952:98)	Paxton (2016a:83)	W.R.B. Oliver (observer?). Considered by Paxton (2016a:83) as the "longest measured" mantle length of any giant squid specimen (though "more reliably" that of #47).
105	1930	Miura Peninsula, Japan {NWP}						?EL: 26 ft 6 in (8.08 m)		Tomilin (1967)	Ellis (1998a:260)	
106 (📷)	1930–1933	Pacific between Hawaii and Samoa {SWP}	Observed swimming alongside ship at high speed before "attacking" it	Architeuthis	Entire	None		Size not estimated	None	Grønningsæter (1946:379, fig. 1a); Ellis (1998a:123, 201)	Welfare & Fairley (1980:74); Aldrich (1991:477); Ellis (1998a:261)	Seen swimming at 20–25 kn (37–46 km/h) (based on three observations) alongside freighter M/V Brunswick (15,000 tons) before turning towards ship and "hitting the hull approximately 150 ft (46 m) from the stern at a depth of 12–15 ft (3.7–4.6 m)", then "skidd[ing] along until it ended up in the propeller, where it was ground to pieces", as recounted by shipmaster Arne Grønningsæter. Veracity of account has been questioned, though taken seriously by Aldrich (1991:477) who described it as "[t]he classical report on the speed of architeuthid swimming" and cited it as evidence that giant squid are sufficiently fast to evade sperm whales (the latter capable of only around 10–12 kn (19–22 km/h)).
107 (📷)	14 January 1933	South Bay Beach, Scarborough, Yorkshire, England {NEA}	Found washed ashore	Architeuthis clarkei Robson, 1933	Entire	Entire		ML: 5 ft 5 in (1.65 m); MW: 1 ft 10 in (0.56 m); FL: 2 ft 1.5 in (0.648 m); FW: 1 ft 7 in (0.48 m) [total]; EL: 17 ft 5 in (5.31 m) [ends of tentacles missing]; WT: 16 st 11 lb (107 kg); numerous additional measurements	BMNH 1933.1.30.5 + 1926.3.31.24 (radula and beak [cast lost?]; also entire specimen minus tentacular clubs) and Scarborough Museums Trust (several sucker rings, including SCARB 2000.952.397); holotype of Architeuthis clarkei Robson, 1933	Clarke (1933:157, fig.); Robson (1933:681, text-figs. 1–7, pl. 1); King (2019:153); Eyden (2020, figs. 1–2, 4, 6)	Yorkshire Evening Post, 14 January 1933; Leeds Mercury, 16, 19 & 21 January 1933; The Yorkshire Post, 17 January 1933; The Illustrated London News, 21 January 1933 (cover story); Hull Daily Mail, 20 June 1933; [Anon.] (1934:57); Stevenson (1935:114); Stephen (1944:264); Rees (1950:40); Hardy (1956:286); Spaul (1956:63); Collins (1998a:489)	Specimen obtained by W.J. Clarke. Featured in magic lantern slides of the time. Preserved in alcohol with second specimen in basement of London's Natural History Museum.
108 (📷)	2 June 1933 (accessioned)	Lairg, Scotland {NEA}	Not stated	?Architeuthis sp.; Architeuthis dux	Not stated	Beak		None given	BMNH catalog no. 1933.6.2.1	[NHM] (N.d.)	Zoology Accessions Register: Mollusca: 1925–1937, p. 163	Donated by Dr. H. Sutherland. Beak preserved in 80% industrial methylated spirit.
109 (📷)	December 1933	Dildo, Newfoundland {NWA}	Not stated		Entire		Male	ML: 1560 mm		[Anon.] (1933:15); Frost (1934:100, figs. 1–5, pls. 1–3)	Knudsen (1957:189); Toll & Hess (1981b:754); Aldrich (1991:476)	A replica of this giant squid is now on display in Dildo.
110 (📷)	26 June 1935	Gulf of Gascogne [Bay of Biscay] (46°50'N) at 200 m depth {NEA}	By trawl	Architeuthis nawaji; Architeuthis harveyi	Entire		Female	EL: 818 cm; ML: 138 cm; FL: 60 cm; TL: 645 cm; AL(IV): 112 cm; AL(I): 110 cm	?MHNLR	Cadenat (1935:513); Cadenat (1936:277, figs. 1–3)		Caught by the Palombe.
111 (📷)	12 November 1935	Holyrood, Harbour Main, Conception Bay, Newfoundland {NWA}	Found washed ashore	Architeuthis sp.	Entire	None; destroyed in fire	Female	ML: 7 ft 2 in (2.18 m); BC: 6 ft 10 in (2.08 m); FL: 2 ft 9 in (0.84 m); FW: 2 ft 1 in (0.64 m); TL: 17 ft 3 in (5.26 m); HL: 1 ft 7 in (0.48 m)	None	Frost (1936:89, figs. 1–10); Stephen (1962:155); Dyson (1982:107); Peterman (2002); see discussion	Downer (1965:6)	Caught by Harbour Main fisherman Joe Ezekiel, who sold specimen to a scientist for NF$10.00 (equivalent to US$234 in 2025). Stored in local Fisheries Department's fish freezer, which caught fire, destroying specimen. At least three photographs of the specimen exist. Nancy Frances Button (née Frost), who wrote detailed paper on find, was brought to Memorial University of Newfoundland in 1964 to view specimen #169, as none of the scientists there had examined a giant squid before.
	7 January 1937	off Bell Rock, Angus, Arbroath, Scotland (56°26′N 02°23′W) {NEA}	By trawl	Architeuthis harveyi (Kent, 1874); Architeuthis dux Steenstrup, 1857	Entire	Tentacles and one arm		BL: ~7 ft (2.1 m); AL: 92 cm; TL: 368 + 421 cm	NMSZ catalog no. 1977107.1	Stephen (1937:131); Heppell & Smith (1983:34)	Stephen (1944:264); Rees (1950:40); Stephen (1962:154); Collins (1998a:489)	Captured alive in trawl, tentacles and one arm cut off and remainder discarded. Date of capture incorrect in Heppell & Smith (1983).
112	22 July 1937	Petone, Wellington, New Zealand {SWP}	Not stated		Not specified	Undetermined		TL: 22 ft (6.7 m)		Dell (1952:98)	Press Association message 22 July 1937	
113 (📷)	October 1938	~0.5 miles (0.8 km) north of Ravenscar, England {NEA}	Found washed ashore	Architeuthis sp.?	Entire?	Beak		?EL: 16 ft (4.9 m); "tentacles [arms?] as thick as a man's arm"	BMNH	Clarke (1939:136, fig.); Eyden (2020, fig. 7)	Spaul (1956:63)	Found on rocky coast by local man named Shippey, who removed beak and took it home; portion of remaining body cut up as fishermen's bait. Beak obtained by W.J. Clarke (through E.A. Wallis) and passed onto the Natural History Museum, London, where G. J. Crawford of the Mollusca Department identified it as Architeuthis without suggesting a species.
114	10 October 1939	near Tromsø, Norway {NEA}	"killed by fishermen"					EL: >13 m; TL: 8.7 m; BC: 3 m [maximum]; AL: 3.1 m [longest]; WT: >1000 kg [estimate]		Wood (1982:191)	Ellis (1998a:261)	Gerald L. Wood called it "the largest known Architeuthis" from Norway. Not weighed; mass estimate attributed to "Karl Basilier, pers. comm.". Possibly the same as 1939 Norway specimen indicated in Sivertsen (1955:11, fig. 4) (map location only).
115	February 1941	Susa Bay, Yamaguchi Prefecture, Japan {NWP}	Not stated	Architeuthis sp.	Entire	Undetermined		ML: ~1.5 m; WT: ~180 kg		Tanaka (1950); Nishimura (1968:75)		
116	1941–1978	Sea of Japan; various locations {NWP}	Found washed ashore	Architeuthis martensi (Hilgendorf, 1880)	20 specimens; entire	Undetermined		None		Okiyama (1993:408, fig. 6)		Summary of Sea of Japan strandings.
117	1945	Pahau River Mouth, Wellington East Coast, New Zealand {SWP}	Found washed ashore		Entire	Undetermined		WT: >1 ton		Dell (1952:98)		
118	early March 1946	south side of inlet to Bømmelfjorden, Lyngholmen, Sveio, Sunnhordland, Norway {NEA}	Found washed ashore, dead	Architeuthes dux [sic]	Entire	None		BL: ~2 m; AL: ~2 m		Tambs-Lyche (1946:287)	Haugesunds Avis, 16 March 1946	Found by Johannes Våga of Lyngholmen who brought it to the attention of Haugesunds Avis, which reported on specimen and notified Bergens Museum. Museum sought remains for examination but specimen already destroyed and buried, after initially being damaged by young boys who tore head off and mutilated mantle. Southernmost Norwegian stranding recorded up to that point.
119 (📷)	11 September 1946	Vikebukt, Romsdalsfjord, Romsdal, Norway {NEA}	Seen swimming around fjord; later found washed ashore	Architeuthis sp.	Entire	Undetermined		EL: 9.35 m; other measurements		Myklebust (1946:377, fig. 1)	Sivertsen (1955:11, map); Ellis (1998a:20)	It has been suggested that a "sea serpent" reported from the same fjord by [Anon.] (1849:264) (based on 28 July 1845 sighting; description attributed to Reverend Mr. Deinboll, archdeacon of Molde) may have been a giant squid.
120	18 November and 5 December 1947	South Atlantic (56°45′00″S 03°49′59″E) {SEA}	From sperm whale stomachs	Architeuthis dux	Not stated, but from two whales			None given	RMNH catalog nos. RMNH.MOL.92235 & 111017	[Naturalis] (2015a); [Naturalis] (2017)		From whale nos. 17 and 61; collected by W. Vervoort. Preserved in 70% alcohol.
121 (📷)	mid-September 1948	Wingan Inlet, Victoria, Australia {SWP}	Found washed ashore	Architeuthis kirkii Robson, 1887	Entire, tentacles largely missing, arms "mutilated and torn off"; poor condition	Head with arms and tail with fins		EL: 14 ft (4.3 m) [partial, on arrival at museum], ~20 ft (6.1 m) [when found], ~28 ft (8.5 m) [estimate if complete]; BL: 7 ft 8 in (2.34 m); GL: 7 ft (2.1 m); HL: 1 ft 6 in (0.46 m); TL: 4 ft (1.2 m) [partial], ≥18 ft (5.5 m) [estimate if complete]; TC: 4 in (10 cm) [stalk]; AL: 4 ft (1.2 m) [partial], ~6 ft (1.8 m) [estimate if complete]; AC: 8–10.5 in (20–27 cm); ASD: ≤1 in (2.5 cm); EyD: 7 in (18 cm); other measurements	AMS?	Allan (1948:306, 2 figs.)	Zeidler (1996:7); Zeidler & Gowlett-Holmes (1996:85)	CSIR Fisheries Division at Cronulla notified about specimen by Mr. W. Warn. Shipment of specimen from Eden to Australian Museum arranged by Lucy M. Willings of CSIR. Gladius and internal organs removed prior to submission. Identified as "largest squid" in 2003 edition of Guinness World Records, a distinction given to the Thimble Tickle specimen (#45) in most prior and subsequent editions.
122	7 September 1949	Hirtshals, Denmark {NEA}	Not stated	Architeuthis dux Steenstrup, 1857	Entire	Undetermined		?WL: 1.75 m ["totallaengde uden fangarme"; "total length without tentacles"]		Muus (1959:170)		
123	2 October 1949	Whalefirth Voe, Shetland, Scotland (60°35′N 01°10′W) {NEA}	Found washed ashore	Architeuthis sp.	Entire	Jaws and sucker rings; remainder cut up for bait		BL: ~4 ft (1.2 m); AL: ~6 ft (1.8 m); TL: ~20 ft (6.1 m)	NMSZ catalog nos. 1950.2 & 1950.3	Stephen (1950:52); Heppell & Smith (1983:33)	Collins (1998a:489)	Originally identified as an octopus. Jaw, description, and sketch sent by Dr. Petersen and two suckers sent by Mr. J. Inkster to NMSZ.
124 (📷)	30 November 1949	Bay of Nigg, Aberdeen, Scotland {NEA}	Found washed ashore	Architeuthis sp.; Architeuthis dux Steenstrup, 1857	Entire	Undetermined; entire?	Female	ML: 117 cm; HL: 28 cm; FL: 44.5 cm; FW: 37.5 cm; extensive additional measurements and description	?Marine Laboratory, Aberdeen, Scotland. Stephen (1962) specimen No. 2	Rae (1950:163, pls. 20–21)	Aberdeen Bon-Accord and Northern Pictorial; Hardy (1956:pl. 22); Stephen (1962:148); Boyle (1986:82); Collins (1998a:489)	
125	22 August 1951	270 miles (430 km) W of Shpanberg Id., at surface {NWP}	Observed from deck of ship, alive	Architeuthis japonicus	Two squid	None		TL: 10–12 m [estimate]	None	Sleptsov (1955:75)	Nesis (2001)	Thought to be avoiding sperm whales by staying at surface. Reportedly only giant squid seen alive in Russian waters.
126	14 December 1951	Angus, East Haven, Scotland {NEA}	Found washed ashore	Architeuthis harveyi	Entire	Jaws, radula, and piece of arm with suckers		ML: 4 ft 9 in (1.45 m)	Undetermined	Stephen (1953:121)	Collins (1998a:489)	Mutilated prior to examination.
127	January 1952	Carnoustie, Scotland {NEA}	Found washed ashore	Architeuthis sp.	Not specified	Undetermined		None		Hardy (1956:287)		
128	12 June 1952	off Sao Lourenco, Madeira Island {NEA}	From sperm whale stomach, vomited up	Architeuthis sp.	Entire	"Fragments"		EL: 10,600 mm; ML: 1,860 mm; TL: 8,500 mm; AL: 2,800 mm; BC: 1,360 mm; TC: 330 mm; WT: 150 kg	MMF	Rees & Maul (1956:266)	Clarke (1962:173)	Still exhibited some signs of life after being vomited.
129	1952	off Fowey Rocks, Florida, United States (Straits of Florida) (25°35.4′N 80°05.8′W) {NWA}	Found floating at surface	Architeuthis princeps or Architeuthis harveyi; Architeuthis dux	Entire, "much mutilated"			ML: 36 in (91 cm); "large"	RSMAS catalog no. UMML 31.189 [specimen No. 1 of Roper et al. (2015)]	Voss (1956:138); Voss (1996); Roper et al. (2015:80)	Ellis (1998a:261)	Voss (1956:138) wrote that it was "no longer in existence" and identification as A. princeps or A. harveyi was based on "recollections [...] of the heart shaped fins".
[4]	1952 (summer)	near Bonin Islands, western Pacific {NWP}	From "digestive canal" of sperm whale	Architeuthis japonica? Pfeffer, 1912; Psychroteuthidae?	Entire; two specimens	Undetermined		ML: 92 mm + 104 mm; extensive additional measurements and description	?Laboratory of Fisheries Zoology, Faculty of Agriculture, University of Tokyo	Iwai (1956:139, pls. 1–5); Roper & Young (1972:220)	Ellis (1998a:121)	Non-architeuthid. Based on the original illustrations and written description, Roper & Young (1972:220) wrote: "the specimens appear to be members of the Psychroteuthidae". Ellis (1998a:121) gives erroneous total length of "8 feet [2.4 m]" for the larger specimen (though correctly given as "8 inches [20 cm]" by Ellis, 1994a:145); mistake repeated by Glaubrecht & Salcedo-Vargas (2004:67), giving rise to the claim of an implausibly large psychroteuthid "with about three meter total length".
130	1953	Norway {NEA}	Not stated		Map location only					Sivertsen (1955:11, fig. 4)		
131 (📷)	1954	off Mississippi Delta, Gulf of Mexico {NWA}	Found floating at surface, dead	Architeuthis physeteris (Joubin, 1899); Architeuthis dux	Entire, in poor condition	Beak and spermatophore	Male (mature)	ML: 61.2 cm; extensive description	RSMAS catalog no. UMML 31.99 [specimen No. 2 of Roper et al. (2015)]	Voss (1956:136, fig. 10); Roper et al. (2015:80)	Roper & Young (1972:220); Toll & Hess (1981b:753); Aldrich (1991:476); Melvin (2009)	Mature male with spermatophores.
132	1954	Skagerrak, Denmark {NEA}		Architeuthis	Entire?	Entire?, both tentacles loose	Male (mature?)	ML: 1035 mm; TL: 4480/3800 mm; CL: 620/695 mm; CSC: 248/248; TSC: 276/271; additional indices and counts	ZMUC [specimen NA-3 of Roeleveld (2002)]	Roeleveld (2002:727)		Tentacle morphology examined by Roeleveld (2002).
133	January 1954	Kie Kie Bay, Kaikōura, New Zealand {SWP}	By trawl	Architeuthis sp.						Förch (1998:105)		Photographs held by NIWA.
134	22 June 1954	1 mile (1.6 km) north of Skaw (Skagerack), Denmark {NEA}	Found alive on surface	Architeuthis sp.	Entire	Entire?, left tentacle loose	Male (mature)	ML: 1010 mm [later 970 mm]; VML: 940 mm; HL: 275 mm; TL: 4900 mm [later 4585/4785 mm]; CL: 605/780 mm; AL(I): 800 mm; AL(IV): 1470/1530 mm; LAL: 1530 mm; HeL: 90/130 mm [IV pair]; PL: 780 mm; SSL: 155 mm; SoA: no obs.; SL: 110–180 mm; CSC: 255/265; TSC: 286/280; additional indices and counts	ZMUC [specimen NA-6 of Roeleveld (2002)]	Knudsen (1957:189, figs. 1–5); Roeleveld (2002:727); Guerra et al. (2004:8)	Kjennerud (1958:1); Muus (1959:170); Stephen (1962:155); Roper & Young (1972:220); Toll & Hess (1981b:753); Aldrich (1991:476)	Discovered by fishermen. Mature male with spermatophores and both ventral arms hectocotylised; colour notes. Tentacle morphology examined by Roeleveld (2002).
135	30 July 1954	Ranheim, Trondheim Fjord, Norway {NEA}	Not stated	Architeuthis dux Steenstrup, 1857	Entire	Undetermined		EL: 7.5 m; BL: 1.3 m; AL: 1.9 m [shorter]; TL: 6.2 m		Sivertsen (1955:5)		
136 (📷)	2 October 1954	Ranheim, Trondheim Fjord, Norway {NEA}	Stranded	Architeuthis dux Steenstrup, 1857	Entire	Entire, left tentacle loose	Female?	EL: 9.24 m; BL: 2.14 m; AL: 1.9 m [shorter]; TL: 7.1 m [left]; ML: 1.79 m; MW: 0.57 m; FL: 0.52 m; FW: 0.18 m [each]; TSD: 2.6 cm; ASD: 1.5 cm; CL: 820 mm [left]; CSC: 254 [left]; TSC: >275 [left]; LRL: 15.6 mm; URL: n/a; additional beak measurements, indices, and counts	VSM; VSM 156 [specimen NA-17 of Roeleveld (2000) and Roeleveld (2002)]	Broch (1954:145, fig.); Sivertsen (1955:5, fig. 1); Roeleveld (2000:185); Roeleveld (2002:727)	Clarke (1966:103, fig. 4)	Much-reproduced photograph shows specimen being measured by Professors Erling Sivertsen and Svein Haftorn. Beak morphometrics studied by Roeleveld (2000). Tentacle morphology examined by Roeleveld (2002). According to Broch (1954) it was stranded on 3 October and found on 4 October, and was 16th specimen recorded from Norway.
	1950s	Point Leamington, Notre Dame Bay, Newfoundland {NWA}	Found washed ashore	"giant squid"	Entire?	None?		None given		Earle (1977:53)		As recollected by former resident who saw specimen when she was a child in the 1950s. Locals were unaware of giant squid and regarded specimen as "something completely unique, one of a kind" but did not report it.
137 (📷)	4 July 1955	off Porto Pim, Faial Island, Azores Islands (38°21′N 29°08′W) {NEA}	From sperm whale stomach	Architeuthis sp.	Entire	Undesignated anatomical material		ML: 6 ft 6 in (1.98 m); BD: 1 ft 11 in (0.58 m); EL: 34 ft 5 in (10.49 m); WL: 16 ft 3 in (4.95 m); TL: 26 ft 8 in (8.13 m); LAL: 9 ft (2.7 m); EyD: 7 2/5 in (0.19 m) [left]; WT: 405 lb (184 kg)	National Institute of Oceanography	Clarke (1955:589, 5 figs.); Clarke (1956a:645)	van Bruggen (1956:641) [NB: gives erroneous metric conversions]; Clarke (1956b:257, pl. 2 fig. 2); Budker (1959); see discussion	Squid swallowed whole by 47 ft (14 m) sperm whale (no. F346). Examined at Porto Pim whaling station. Budker (1959) states: "This is probably the only complete specimen of such an animal to be collected under these conditions." Considered by Paxton (2016a:83) as specimen with the longest "definitely measured" mantle length (less reliably #151), standard length, and total length (though see discredited size of #209) of any giant squid recovered from a sperm whale.
138 (📷)	12 May 1956	about a mile north of Mākara Stream, Wellington west coast, New Zealand {SWP}	Found washed ashore	Architeuthis kirki Robson, 1887	Entire, missing tentacles	Entire?		ML: 1829 mm; WT: 127.9 kg; extensive additional measurements and description	Dominion Museum [NMNZ]	Dell (1970:27, figs. 1–8)	Roper & Young (1972:216)	Arm suckers had no sucker rings; likely dissolved after preservation in formalin.
[5]	1956/1957	South Orkney Islands (59°41′S 44°14′W) {SWA}	From sperm whale stomach	Architeuthis sp.; Mesonychoteuthis hamiltoni Robson, 1925	Head and mantle	Undetermined		HL: 30 cm; HW: 20 cm; EyD: 16–17 cm; ?EL: ~12 m		Korabelnikov (1959:103); Yukhov (1974:62)		Non-architeuthid. Initial identification by I.I. Akimushkin. From 15.8 m long male sperm whale.
[6]	1956/1957	South Shetland Islands (61°56′S 52°39′W) {SWA}	From sperm whale stomach	Architeuthis sp.; Mesonychoteuthis hamiltoni Robson, 1925	Fin only	Undetermined		FL: 41 cm; FW: 48 cm; ?EL: ~10 m		Korabelnikov (1959:103); Yukhov (1974:62)		Non-architeuthid. Initial identification by I.I. Akimushkin. From 15 m long male sperm whale.
139	1 February 1957	six miles (10 km) north by east from Rattray Head, Aberdeenshire, Scotland {NEA}	By trawl	Architeuthis sp.; Architeuthis dux Steenstrup, 1857	Entire	Entire		EL: 23 ft 11 in (7.29 m); ML: 940 mm; BD: 343 mm; TL: 4750 mm [right]; CL: 559 mm [right]; HL: 279 mm; FL: 305 mm; FW: 305 mm	NMSZ catalog no. 1957.20. Stephen specimen No. 3	Stephen et al. (1957:181); Stephen (1962:152, text-fig. 6, pl. 1 fig. 2); Heppell & Smith (1983:33)	Rae & Lamont (1963:23); Collins (1998a:489)	Received from trawler Viking Prestige almost complete, but poorly preserved.
140	14 December 1957	Misaki, Oki Islands, Japan {NWP}	Not stated	?Architeuthis sp.	Entire	Undetermined		None		Hamabe (1957); Nishimura (1968:75)		
141	4 February 1958	Ashiya, Hamasaka-machi, Hyōgo Prefecture, Japan {NWP}	Found washed ashore	Architeuthis sp.	Entire	Undetermined		?EL: 4.1 m; WT: ~150 kg		Kamita (1962); Nishimura (1968:75)		
142	7 February 1958	off Hagi, Yamaguchi Prefecture, Japan {NWP}	Not stated	Architeuthis sp.	Entire	Undetermined		?EL: ~6 m; WT: 170 kg		Kamita (1962); Nishimura (1968:75)		
143	3 March 1958	Sandane, Nordfjord, Norway {NEA}	Not stated	Architeuthis sp.	Entire	Entire	Male (mature)	ML: 100 cm; WT: 48 kg; more VML: 87 cm; BC: 80 cm; FL: 28–32 cm; FW: 26/33 cm; HL: 30–32 cm; HW: 25 cm; AL(I): 126+ cm; AL(II): 143+ cm; AL(III): 126+ cm; AL(IV): 164 cm; LAL: 164 cm; AC(I): 16 cm; AC(II): 20 cm; AC(III): 22 cm; AC(IV): 22 cm; HeL: 5–6 cm [IV pair]; AF: 4.3.2.1; TaL: 10 cm; FuL: 14 cm; FuD: 7 cm; FuCL: 12 cm; FuCW: 2.5 cm; PL: 92 cm; SoA: yes; LRL: 1.2 cm; URL: 1.5 cm	ZMUB	Kjennerud (1958:1, figs. 1–9); Guerra et al. (2004b:8)	van Bruggen (1959:857); Toll & Hess (1981b:753)	Spermatophore and colour notes. Fins appeared to be slightly asymmetrical.
144 (📷)	1958	northeast sector, Bahamas {NWA}	Found floating at surface	Architeuthis dux	Entire, "nearly intact whole specimen"	Arm parts	Female	EL: 1433.5 cm	RSMAS catalog no. UMML 31.2938 [specimen No. 3 of Roper et al. (2015)]	Voss (1967:411); Rathjen (1973:24, fig. 7); Roper et al. (2015:80)	Ellis (1998a:261)	Possibly specimen illustrated in Rathjen (1973:24), which was taken by the vessel Silver Bay "off the coast of Florida" and said to measure 47 ft (equivalent to 14.33 m) in "overall length".
145	August 1959	off Madeira Island {NEA}	From sperm whale stomach	Architeuthis sp.	Entire	Undetermined		?EL: 2.5 m		Clarke (1962:173, fig. 1A)	Toll & Hess (1981b:754)	From male sperm whale.
146	January?, 1960	Lonja de Aviles, Asturias, Spain {NEA}	Not specified	Architeuthis dux	Not specified	Returned to the sea		WT: 100 kg		Guerra et al. (2006:258)		
147	6 February 1960	Arahama, Kashiwazaki-shi, Niigata Prefecture, Japan {NWP}	Found washed ashore	Architeuthis sp.	Entire	Undetermined		ML: 1.3 m; ?EL: 3.5 m; WT: 112 kg		Nishimura (1960:214); Nishimura (1968:75)		
148 (📷)	5 September 1960	Skagerrak (58.95°N 10.58333°E), 32 km W of Strömstad, Bohuslän, Sweden {NEA}	Caught by shrimp fishermen	Architeuthis sp.; Architeuthis dux	Entire; tentacles intact	Entire			SMNH catalog no. 36442	[SMNH] (2026a)		On public display. Likely caught by shrimp trawler. Purchased by Swedish Museum of Natural History for 50 kronor (equivalent to US$105 in 2025) from Kåveruds Fiskaffär (lit. "Kåverud's Fish Shop"), Stockholm. Since 2024, displayed at the museum in 300-litre tank as part of "Värld av Vatten" ("World of Water") permanent exhibition, preserved in 80% ethanol. Identified as Architeuthis sp. by Anders Warén in 2001.
	23 January 1961	Oi, Hirata-shi, Shimane Prefecture, Japan {NWP}	Found washed ashore	Architeuthis sp.	Entire	Undetermined		?EL: 2.6 m; WT: 41.2 kg		Kamita (1962); Nishimura (1968:75)		
149 (📷)	18 February 1961	Câmara de Lobos, Madeira Island {NEA}	From fish stomach, Alepisaurus cf. ferox	Architeuthis sp. A	Entire	Entire	Female (juvenile)	ML: 57 mm [later 56 mm]; VML: 54 mm; MW: 12 mm; FL: 20 mm; FW: 15 mm; HL: 17 mm; HW: 11 mm; GiL: 16 mm; AL(I): 47 mm; AL(II): 59 mm; AL(III): 58 mm; AL(IV): 58 mm; TL: 90 mm [later left tentacle 80 mm]; CL: 25 mm; ASD(I): 0.96 mm; ASD(II): 1.04 mm; ASD(III): 0.96 mm; ASD(IV): 0.64 mm; CSD: 0.96 mm/0.40 mm (medial/marginal); LRL: 1.0 mm; URL: 1.2 mm; extensive description and additional counts, indices, and beak measurements	NMNH cat. no. 727508 [specimen NA-34 of Roeleveld (2002)]	Roper & Young (1972:206, figs. 1a–c, 2–4, 5a); Roper (1992:99, figs. 160a–c); Roeleveld (2002:727)	Nesis et al. (1985:526); Roper & Shea (2013:116)	From stomach of lancetfish No. 18123, captured on tuna long-line at 50–150 m depth and supplied by G. E. Maul. Squid's greatly distended stomach contained largely unidentifiable material with some small fragments of fish bones. Sucker rings missing; likely degraded by digestive juices or formalin fixative. Tentacle morphology examined by Roeleveld (2002).
150	April–July 1961	near Commander Islands and western Aleutian Islands, Bering Sea {NWP}	From sperm whale stomachs	Architeuthis japonica Pfeffer, 1912	Combined beak samples	Undetermined		Percentage of whale diet		Kodolov (1970:[158])		From sperm whales sampled in several different whaling regions of Soviet whaling flotilla Aleut during the 1961 season.
151	August 1961	Sao Miguel, Azores Islands {NEA}	From sperm whale stomach	Architeuthis sp.	Entire	Undetermined		ML: 2.4 m; [?]AL: 4.4 m; WL: 6.8 m		Keil (1963:320, figs. 3–5)		From 16 m sperm whale. Considered by Paxton (2016a:83) as possibly greatest measured mantle length of any giant squid recovered from a sperm whale (more reliably #137), though he wrote: "the account is confused and the 2.4 m figure probably refers to the head and ML combined".
152	16 September 1961	off central California, United States {NEP}	From sperm whale stomach	Architeuthis japonica Pfeffer, 1912	Beaks	One upper beak		None	NMML 110	Fiscus (1993:92)		From male sperm whale (specimen no. Rice-535).
153	December 1961	King's Cove, Bonavista Bay, Newfoundland {NWA}	Not stated	Architeuthis sp.	Entire?	None		"small"	Undetermined	Aldrich (1968); Aldrich (1991:459)		
154	April–July 1962	near Commander Islands and western Aleutian Islands, Bering Sea {NWP}	From sperm whale stomachs	Architeuthis japonica Pfeffer, 1912	Combined beak samples	Undetermined		Percentage of whale diet		Kodolov (1970:[158])		From sperm whales sampled in several different whaling regions of Soviet whaling flotilla Aleut during the 1962 season.
155	23 June 1962	Durban Whaling Station, South Africa {SIO}	From sperm whale stomach	Architeuthis sp.	Body only	Undetermined	Male	FL: 40 cm; FW: 28 cm	None?; Clarke specimen No. 6	Clarke (1980:67)		From sperm whale number A956.
156	1962	Donkergat Whaling Station, South Africa {SEA}	From sperm whale stomach	Architeuthis sp.	Head only	Undetermined		TL: 176 cm	Undetermined; Clarke specimen No. 1	Clarke (1980:67, text-fig. 37A)		
157	1962	Las Tiberas, Asturias, Spain {NEA}	Not specified	Architeuthis dux	Not specified	Not specified		TL: 6 m		Guerra et al. (2006:258)		
158	12 November 1962	off east coast of Florida, United States (Straits of Florida) (25°45′N 80°00′W; given as "25°45'N 80°W") {NWA}	Found floating at surface	Architeuthis sp.; Architeuthis dux	Entire	Gladius	Male (mature)	ML: 66.4 cm; EL 7.0 m	RSMAS catalog no. UMML 31.1762 [specimen No. 4 of Roper et al. (2015)]	Toll & Hess (1981b:753); Roper et al. (2015:80)	Roper & Young (1972:220)	
159	13 June 1963	Durban Whaling Station, South Africa {SIO}	From sperm whale stomach	Architeuthis sp.	Head only	Undetermined		HL: 19 cm; HW: 15 cm; WT: 19 kg	None?; Clarke specimen No. 2	Clarke (1980:67)		From sperm whale number D1500.
160	15 June 1963	off central California, United States {NEP}	From sperm whale stomach	Architeuthis japonica Pfeffer, 1912	Beaks	One upper beak		None	NMML catalog no. 111	Fiscus (1993:92)		From male sperm whale (specimen no. Rice-813).
161	1963	Donkergat Whaling Station, South Africa {SEA}	From sperm whale stomach	Architeuthis sp.	Body only	Undetermined	Female	ML: 66.5 cm; MW: 24 cm; FL: 29 cm; FW: 16 cm	Undetermined; Clarke specimen No. 3	Clarke (1980:67, text-fig. 37B)		From sperm whale no. 2271.
162	13 August 1963	Durban Whaling Station, South Africa {SIO}	From sperm whale stomach	Architeuthis sp.	Entire	Undetermined		ML: ~70 cm; HL: ~23 cm; FL: ~30 cm; FW: ~22 cm	None?; Clarke specimen No. 5	Clarke (1980:67, text-fig. 37A)		From sperm whale number 2258.
163	August?, 1963	Cook Strait, New Zealand {SWP}	From sperm whale stomach	Architeuthis sp.	One beak	Undetermined		None		Gaskin & Cawthorn (1967:170)		From New Zealand whaling station; specimen No. 63 of 1963–1964 season.
164 (📷)	17 December 1963	off Chile, South America (19°51′S 95°09′W) {SEP}	From fish stomach, "very probably Alepisaurus"	Architeuthis sp. B	Entire, sucker rings degraded and missing	Entire	Male (juvenile)	ML: 45 mm; VML: 43 mm; MW: 8 mm; FL: 14 mm; FW: 11 mm; HL: 11 mm; HW: 9 mm; GiL: 14 mm; AL(I): 20 mm; AL(II): 27 mm; AL(III): 27 mm; AL(IV): 28 mm; TL: 33 mm; CL: 14 mm; ASD(I): 0.72 mm; ASD(II): 0.88 mm; ASD(III): 0.80 mm; ASD(IV): 0.56 mm; CSD: 0.56 mm/0.24 mm (medial/marginal); extensive description and additional counts and indices	NMNH catalog no. 727509	Roper & Young (1972:206, figs. 1d–e, 5b); Roper (1992:99, figs. 160d–e)	Nesis et al. (1985:526); Roper & Shea (2013:116)	From lancetfish captured on long-line at 80–150 m depth by R/V Shoyo Maru (Cruise 13, Fish Station 17). Squid specimen and capture information supplied by Witek L. Klawe. Stomach found to be empty. Sucker rings missing; likely degraded by digestive juices or formalin fixative.
165	23 April 1964	Durban Whaling Station, South Africa {SIO}	From sperm whale stomach	Architeuthis sp.	Body only	Undetermined		ML: 58 cm; MW: 19 cm; FL: 23 cm; FW: 11.5 cm	None?; Clarke specimen No. 4	Clarke (1980:67)		From sperm whale number 2418.
166	1964	Southeastern Atlantic Ocean {SEA}	From sperm whale stomachs	Architeuthis sp.	Map locations only					Yukhov (1974:61, fig.)		Multiple records from sperm whales with generalised data on distribution, depth, and sex.
167	1964	Southwestern Pacific Ocean {SWP}	From sperm whale stomachs	Architeuthis sp.	Map locations only	Undetermined				Yukhov (1974:61, fig.)		Multiple records from sperm whales with generalised data on distribution, depth, and sex.
168	1964	Southwestern Indian Ocean {SIO}	From sperm whale stomachs	Architeuthis sp.	Map locations only					Yukhov (1974:61, fig.)		Multiple records from sperm whales with generalised data on distribution, depth, and sex.
169 (📷)	23 October 1964	off Cape Fox, Conche, White Bay, Newfoundland {NWA}	Found floating at surface	Architeuthis harveyi; Architeuthis dux Steenstrup, 1857	Entire; no lacerations on body	Beaks, gladius, arms, and tentacles	Female	ML: 185 cm; WT: 331 lb (150 kg); additional measurements and description	MUDB; Aldrich specimen No. 1	[Anon.] (1964:7); Daly (1964:1, fig.); Downer (1965:6, 8); [Anon.] (1969:13); Aldrich (1991:461, figs. 3–4)	Stoker (1965:8, fig.); Aldrich & Brown (1967:4, figs.); Aldrich (1968:395); Aldrich & Aldrich (1968:845, figs. 1–3); Pippy & Aldrich (1969); Aldrich (1977:2); Aldrich (1978:2); Oreskes (2003:717, fig. 3)	Nicknamed "Archi". Collected by John McGrath; initially stored frozen at Conche Bait Department before being transferred by EPA plane to Frederick Aldrich at Memorial University of Newfoundland on 7 November (where temporarily held at animal house to allow viewing by students), following three weeks of bad weather that prevented plane from landing at Conche. Weighed on Air Canada baggage scales at Torbay Airport. Said to be most discussed biological specimen in university's history. Already partially dissected by morning of 9 November; Aldrich and undergraduate student Sylvia Ruby made comparative study of its nervous system and that of commercially important Illex illecebrosus. Illustrations taken of dissected parts, together with ~150 b&w photos and ~60–70 colour photos. Nancy Frances Button (née Frost) of New Melbourne, Trinity Bay, who was person "most closely connected" to last good specimen from Newfoundland in 1935 (#111), was brought in to examine remains and said to have been "tremendous help" to Aldrich and others, for whom this was their first giant squid specimen. Two classes (Biology 230 and Biology 591) and upper level students allowed to examine remains. Great effort made to use Newfoundland news media to spread information on find to general public and request information on future specimens. Stomach empty; cestode found in caecum by Pippy & Aldrich (1969). Tentacular regeneration documented by Aldrich & Aldrich (1968); one of two published records of limb regeneration in architeuthids (as identified by Imperadore & Fiorito, 2018), the other being a case of arm and sucker regeneration in #54 (see also #549). Postulated to have died of natural causes. Frederick Aldrich included a photo of this specimen in a 1965 letter to Paul Fye, director of the Woods Hole Oceanographic Institution, proposing to use DSV Alvin to study the giant squid in its natural habitat. Served as main basis for "life-sized" giant squid model at Peabody Museum of Natural History.
170	5 December 1964	Chapel Arm, Trinity Bay, Newfoundland {NWA}	Found dead on bottom	Architeuthis dux Steenstrup, 1857	Entire	None; discarded	Female	ML: 126 cm; additional measurements and description	None; Aldrich specimen No. 2	Ferman (1965:6); Aldrich (1991:466, fig. 5)	Stoker (1965:8); Downer (1965:8); Aldrich (1968:395)	Possibly seen alive in September on several occasions. Found at depth of around 10 ft (3.0 m) by two young boys playing on beach, who dragged it onto beach; found two weeks later by Herbert Reid of Chapel Arm who telephoned Frederick Aldrich, having seen the latter's advertisement requesting information on any local specimens; transferred to Memorial University of Newfoundland's animal house and dissection commenced on same day. Incorrectly referred to as Illex illecebrosus by Ferman (1965:6).
171	1960s	Bahamas (Straits of Florida) (25°45′N 79°15′W) {NWA}	Found floating at surface	Architeuthis dux	"head, beaks, eye lens"			"large"	RSMAS catalog no. UMML 31.642 [specimen No. 7 of Roper et al. (2015)]	Roper et al. (2015:80)		Voss (1967:411) wrote of "the head and body of an 18-foot [5.5 m] [giant] squid picked up dead off Miami by a charter-boat captain" that he examined a week after #174 in 1965. Yoshikawa (2014) writes: "A 14-meter-long giant squid caught off the Bahamas in the Atlantic in 1966 is the largest ever confirmed."
172 (📷)	23 or 25 March 1965	Skagen, Denmark {NEA}		Architeuthis dux			Female (immature)	ML: 1190 mm [~1 m in April 2017]; TL: 5495/5307 mm; CL: 745/722 mm; CSC: 272; [left] TSC: 300 [left]; additional indices and counts	ZMUC catalog no. NHMD-141565 [specimen NA-1 of Roeleveld (2002)]	Roeleveld (2002:727); [NHMD] (2021)		Tentacle morphology examined by Roeleveld (2002). Preserved in 70% ethanol; identified by Thomas Kristensen.
173	29 September 1965	Newman's Cove, Bonavista Bay, Newfoundland {NWA}	Not stated	Architeuthis dux Steenstrup, 1857	Portion of mantle, tail, and viscera	None; discarded	Female (also reported as male)	ML: 1.37 m [estimate]	None; Aldrich specimen No. 3	Aldrich (1991:467)	[Anon.] (1965:7); Aldrich (1968:395)	
174 (📷)	8 October 1965	Lance Cove, Trinity Bay, Newfoundland {NWA}	Found floating at surface, dead	Architeuthis dux Steenstrup, 1857	Entire	Parts (unspecified)	Female (immature)	ML: 127 cm; additional measurements	MUDB; Aldrich specimen No. 4	[Anon.] (1965:7, 6 figs.); Aldrich (1991:469, fig. 6)	Voss (1967:407, 411, fig.); Aldrich & Brown (1967:6, fig.); Aldrich (1968:395, fig. 2); Welfare & Fairley (1980:72, fig.); [MIT] (2006); Greshko (2016, fig.)	Nicknamed "Harriet". Dissection by Frederick Aldrich and Gilbert Voss led to discovery of giant nerve fibres in Architeuthis; featured in March 1967 issue of National Geographic. Used in Francis O. Schmitt's animal nerve cell research in 1965.
175	24 November 1965	Springdale Beach, Notre Dame Bay, Newfoundland {NWA}	Found washed ashore	Architeuthis dux Steenstrup, 1857	Entire	None; discarded		ML: 161 cm; BL(+HL?): 2.13 m; TL: 3.66 m; GL: 147 cm; additional measurements	None; Aldrich specimen No. 5	Aldrich (1991:469, fig. 7)	Aldrich (1968:395)	
176	22 June 1966	off "Vigo, Spain" (41°32′N 9°48′W) {NEA}	From sperm whale stomach	Architeuthis sp.	Lower beak	Undetermined		Description only		Clarke & MacLeod (1974:962, fig. 4)		
177	around 10 October 1966	Skagerrak, north of Skagen, Denmark {NEA}		Architeuthis			Female (immature)	ML: 1115 mm; TL: 4605 mm [right]; CL: 660 mm [right]; CSC: 250 [right]; TSC: 284 [right]; additional indices and counts	ZMUC [specimen NA-2 of Roeleveld (2002)]	Roeleveld (2002:727)		Tentacle morphology examined by Roeleveld (2002).
178 (📷)	9 November 1966	Sweet Bay, Bonavista Bay, Newfoundland {NWA}	Not stated	Architeuthis dux Steenstrup, 1857	Entire; tentacles missing and arms incomplete	Entire	Female	ML: 142 cm; additional measurements and description	MUDB; Aldrich specimen No. 6	[Anon.] (1966:1, 3, fig.); Aldrich (1991:470)	[Anon.] (1967:11, fig.); Aldrich & Brown (1967:8, fig.); Aldrich (1968:395)	Found by Edward Legge; delivered to Memorial University of Newfoundland by Mr. Mercer of Biology Department in university truck on 11 November at 4 a.m., where it was received by Frederick Aldrich. Kept frozen in Job Brothers facility prior to dissection. Slightly larger than previous specimens; initially thought by Aldrich to be new species.
179	24 November 1966	Wild Cove, Fogo Island, Notre Dame Bay, Newfoundland {NWA}	Found washed ashore	Architeuthis dux Steenstrup, 1857	Entire, badly mutilated	None; discarded	Female	ML: 107 cm; additional measurements	None; Aldrich specimen No. 7	Aldrich (1991:471)	Aldrich (1968:395)	
180	25 November 1966	off central California, United States {NEP}	From sperm whale stomach	Architeuthis japonica Pfeffer, 1912	Beaks	One upper beak		None	NMML catalog no. 112	Fiscus (1993:92)		From male sperm whale (specimen no. Rice-1966-165).
181	28 November 1966	Eddie's Cove East, Strait of Belle Isle, Newfoundland {NWA}	Not stated	Architeuthis dux Steenstrup, 1857	Entire, putrefied	None; discarded		None	None; Aldrich specimen No. 8	Aldrich (1991:471)	Aldrich (1968:395)	
182	1 December 1966	off central California, United States {NEP}	From sperm whale stomach	Architeuthis japonica Pfeffer, 1912	Beaks	One lower beak fragment		None	NMML catalog no. 113	Fiscus (1993:92)		From female sperm whale (specimen no. Rice-1966-177).
183	9 December 1966	off central California, United States {NEP}	From sperm whale stomach	Architeuthis japonica Pfeffer, 1912	Beaks	One upper beak		None	NMML catalog no. 114	Fiscus (1993:92)		From male sperm whale (specimen no. Rice-1966-185).
184	12 May 1967	off central California, United States {NEP}	From sperm whale stomach	Architeuthis japonica Pfeffer, 1912	Beaks	One pair of beaks		None	NMML catalog no. 115	Fiscus & Rice (1974:92, fig. 1); Fiscus et al. (1989:6); Fiscus (1993:93)		From female sperm whale (specimen no. Rice-1967-128).
185	6 June 1967	off Iceland (64E50'N, 29E30'W) {NEA}	From sperm whale stomach	Architeuthis sp.	Seven beaks	Undetermined		Specimen weights estimated		Clarke & MacLeod (1976:742)		From 53 ft (16 m) male sperm whale (no. 121).
186	July–August 1967	in Denmark Strait {NEA}	From sperm whale stomach	Architeuthis sp.	Beaks (as percentage of diet)					Martin & Clarke (1986:785)	Roe (1969:93) as unidentified beaks	From 57 male sperm whales processed at Hvalur hf. whaling station on west coast of Iceland.
187	22 July – 23 August 1967	off Iceland {NEA}	From sperm whale stomachs	Architeuthis sp.	Two beaks	Undetermined		Specimen weights estimated		Clarke & MacLeod (1976:742)		Mixed samples from stomachs of five male sperm whales 47–53 ft (14–16 m) long.
188	23 April 1968	off central California, United States {NEP}	From sperm whale stomach	Architeuthis japonica Pfeffer, 1912	Beaks	One upper beak		None	NMML catalog no. 116	Fiscus (1993:93)		From female sperm whale (specimen no. Rice-1968-108).
189	23 April 1968	off central California, United States {NEP}	From sperm whale stomach	Architeuthis japonica Pfeffer, 1912	Beaks	One upper beak fragment		None	NMML catalog no. 117	Fiscus (1993:93)		From male sperm whale (specimen no. Rice-1968-109).
190	14 May 1968	Tokyo Bay, off Miura Peninsula, Kanagawa Prefecture, Japan {NWP}	Found stranded on beach	Architeuthis	Entire?	Single tentacle?		EL: 6 m; WT: 35 kg; TL: 3200 mm [length of single extant tentacle]	Keikyu Aburatsubo Marine Park	Suyehiro (1968); Kubodera & Yamada (2001:238)	[Anon.] (2014b)	Stranded on Miura beach two days before Tokachi earthquake of 16 May 1968. Single tentacle deposited at Keikyu Aburatsubo Marine Park may belong to this specimen; see Kubodera & Yamada (2001:238).
191	15 May 1968	South Shore, Bermuda {NWA}	Found washed ashore	Architeuthis dux	Entire?	Entire?		ML: ~70 cm; EyD: 20 cm	BAMZ 2007 254 015 [specimen No. 5 of Roper et al. (2015)]	Roper et al. (2015:80)		"Suckers in 2 rows only".
192	1968	Puerto de Vega, Asturias, Spain {NEA}	Caught by ship	Architeuthis dux	Entire?	Beak		?EL: 7 m		Guerra et al. (2006:258)		Caught by the ship Matías Bengoechea.
193	July–November 1968	off central California, United States ("Region II"; 34°34'–36°N 121°–123°W) {NEP}	From fish stomach, Thunnus alalunga (albacore)	Architeuthidae, Unidentified sp.	One specimen; beaks?			None		Iverson (1971:14, 34)	Roper & Young (1972:221)	Single architeuthid specimen from 905 examined albacore stomachs (of which 286 from "Region II").
194	9 June 1969	east of Lake Worth, Florida, United States (Straits of Florida) (coordinates given as "26°70'N 80°W" [sic]) {NWA}	Found floating at surface	Architeuthis dux	"head, base of arms only"			"large"	RSMAS catalog no. UMML 31.675 [specimen No. 6 of Roper et al. (2015)]	Voss (1996); Roper et al. (2015:80)	Ellis (1998a:262)	
195	13 June 1969	off central California, United States {NEP}	From sperm whale stomach	Architeuthis japonica Pfeffer, 1912	Beaks	One upper beak		None	NMML catalog no. 118	Fiscus (1993:93)		From female sperm whale (specimen no. Rice-1969-143).
196	1969	Las Tiberas, Asturias, Spain {NEA}	Caught by ship	Architeuthis dux	Tentacle			TL: 6 m		Guerra et al. (2006:258)		Caught by the ship Saturno Juan.
197 (📷)	10 or 11 July 1969	near Cabo de Peñas, Luanco, Gozón, Asturias, Spain {NEA}	Caught by sport fishermen, dying	Architeuthis dux	Entire			EL: >12 m; ?TL: 7.5 m; WT: 250 kg		Guerra et al. (2006:258); [Anon.] (c. 2010, 2 figs.)	Local newspaper	Caught by sport fishermen Dr. Julián Morán and Mr. Piñón from Oviedo. Heaviest recorded giant squid from Asturias and possibly from entire Atlantic Ocean.
198	1969	Puerto de Figueras, Asturias, Spain {NEA}	Recovered dead	Architeuthis dux	Entire?			?EL: 7.90 m; WT: 120 kg		Guerra et al. (2006:258)		Recovered dead by José Manuel Méndez and Bote Carducha.
199	19 November 1969	off central California, United States {NEP}	From sperm whale stomach	Architeuthis japonica Pfeffer, 1912	Beaks	One lower beak fragment		None	NMML catalog no. 119	Fiscus (1993:93)		From male sperm whale (specimen no. Rice-1969-201).
200	24 February 1970	off central California, United States {NEP}	From sperm whale stomach	Architeuthis japonica Pfeffer, 1912	Beaks	One lower beak fragment		None	NMML catalog no. 120	Fiscus (1993:94)		From male sperm whale (specimen no. Rice-1970-001).
201	11 October 1970	San Juan, Puerto Rico (Caribbean Sea) (18°32′N 66°05′W) {NWA}	Found floating at surface	Architeuthis dux	Entire?	Beaks		?ML: 85.1 cm	RSMAS catalog no. UMML 31.851 [specimen No. 8 of Roper et al. (2015)]	Voss (1996); Roper et al. (2015:80)	Ellis (1998a:262)	
202	18 September 1970	off Saint-Pierre Island, Grand Banks, Atlantic Ocean, at 293 m depth {NWA}	By trawl	Architeuthis dux Steenstrup, 1857	Entire	Entire	Female	EL: 9.5 m	FOSJ; Aldrich specimen No. 9	Aldrich (1991:471)	[Anon.] (1971:1); [Anon.] (1972:22); [Anon.] (1981:28, fig.)	Caught by Spanish pair trawlers. Presented by Government of France to Fisheries Research Board of Canada in October 1970. Largest preserved specimen at Northwest Atlantic Fisheries Centre, where placed on display.
203	31 October 1970	near Azores Islands (38°34′N 28°11′W) {NEA}	From shark stomach, Centroscymnus coelolepis	Architeuthis sp.	"Flesh"	Undetermined		None		Clarke & Merrett (1972:601)		
204	November 1970	Tasman Sea {SWP}	From sperm whale stomachs	Architeuthis sp.	One entire; 54 lower beaks	Undetermined	Female	ML: 41.5 cm; BC: 26 cm; AL: 32–49.5 cm; TL: 140 cm; FL: 20 cm; FW: 8 cm; plus estimates of other specimen weights from beaks		Clarke & MacLeod (1982:34)		Combined data from stomachs of 66 sperm whales taken at various locations in the Tasman Sea.
205	30 December 1970	off Botany Bay, New South Wales, eastern Australia {SWP}	From shortfin mako shark stomach, Isurus oxyrinchus	Architeuthis sp.	Beak	Undetermined		ML: 567 mm [estimate]		Dunning et al. (1993:129)		
206	November–April 1970 – 1973	southeastern Atlantic Ocean (30°–43°S) {SEA}	From sperm whale stomachs	Architeuthis sp.	Stomach contents	Undetermined		None		Vovk et al. (1975[1978:131])		Specimens from sperm whales taken on 3 cruises (14 stations) of Antarctic whaling factory ship Yury Dolgoruky during November to April 1970 – 1973.
207	November–April 1970 – 1973	Atlantic sector of Southern Ocean {SEA}	From sperm whale stomachs	Architeuthis sp.	Stomach contents	Undetermined		None		Vovk et al. (1975[1978:131])		Specimens from sperm whales taken on 3 cruises (42 stations) of Antarctic whaling factory ship Yury Dolgoruky during November to April 1970 – 1973.
208	March 1971	Carrandi, Asturias, Spain {NEA}	Not specified	Architeuthis dux	Entire?			WT: 80 kg		Guerra et al. (2006:258)		Collected by the boat Divino San Antonio.
209	Unknown (reported 1971)	Indian Ocean {SIO}	From sperm whale stomach	Architeuthis sp.	Entire	Undetermined		EL: 9 m [erroneously given as 19 m in Berzin (1971); see Romanov et al. (2017)]		Berzin (1971:[199, fig. 98])	Paxton (2016a:83); Romanov et al. (2017)	Taken from sperm whale stomach by whaling flotilla Sovetskaya Ukraina. Considered by Paxton (2016a:83) as possibly "longest measured" total length of any giant squid specimen (though more reliably that of #45 and 62), but this was based on the erroneous total length given in Berzin (1971). (Note: Though he considered the Berzin specimen a candidate for the "longest measured" giant squid total length, Paxton (2016a:86) thought the record "suspect because of the roundness of the figure, the lack of detailed measurements and because in an associated photo, the mantle (whose length was not given) does not look very large compared to the men in the image. Consequently the measurement, if accurate, would represent another animal with very long tentacles." The supposed 19 m (62 ft) total length of the Berzin specimen was later confirmed to be erroneous; according to Valentin Yukhov, who was involved in the specimen's discovery, it should have read 9 m (30 ft). The misprint was reproduced in the English translation of Berzin's work, published the following year, and was later propagated in a number of papers on giant squid.)
210	18 November 1971	off Frenchman's Island, Sunnyside, Trinity Bay, Newfoundland {NWA}	Found washed ashore	Architeuthis dux Steenstrup, 1857	Entire; "best possible condition [...] of a squid washed ashore"	Arms and tentacles only	Female	ML: 177 cm; EL: 26 ft 4 in (8.03 m); WT: >300 lb (140 kg); additional measurements	MUDB; Aldrich specimen No. 10	[Anon.] (1971:1, fig.); [Anon.] (1972:22, fig.); Aldrich (1991:471, fig. 8A–B)		Found by Mr. W.T. Parsons of Sunnyside on 18 November; taken to Sunnyside on same day and collected following day by Memorial University of Newfoundland personnel. Examined by Frederick Aldrich and his research assistant C.C. Lu.
211	February 1972	Puerto de El Musel, Asturias, Spain {NEA}	Found floating at surface in visible state of decomposition	Architeuthis dux				?EL: ~3 m		Guerra et al. (2006:258)		Observed[?] by Martino Andres.
212	July 1972	near Rakautura, Kaikōura, New Zealand {SWP}	Found floating at surface	Architeuthis sp.	Entire	Club suckers		TL: ~8 m	Lost	Förch (1998:106)	Dangerfield (2013)	Found by fishermen Gus and Ken Garbes. Could not be towed in due to bad weather; pieces cut off for use as bait.
213	1972	off Durban, South Africa {SIO}	From sperm whale stomach	Architeuthis sp.	Entire	Entire	Female	ML: 1450 mm; extensive additional measurements, illustrations, and description	SAM catalog no. S1867	Roeleveld & Lipiński (1991:432, pls.)		
214	1972	off Newfoundland {NWA}	By trawl	Architeuthis sp.	Entire	Entire		EL: 8.2 m; WT: 207 kg	Aquário Vasco da Gama, Lisbon	Marques (2002)		On public display. Exhibited at Aquário Vasco da Gama in Lisbon (see information document).
215	8 December 1972	eastern equatorial Atlantic (6°34′S 5°00′W) {SEA}	Found in stomach contents of blue shark (Prionace glauca)	Architeuthis sp.	Jaws plus pieces of mantle, arms, tentacle	Undetermined; beaks?		TL: 2 m [piece]; TSD: ~2 cm; ML: 70–75 cm [estimate]		Nigmatullin (1976:29, fig. 1)		From stomach of 2 m long blue shark.
216	14 May 1974	off Green Point light house, Table Bay, South Africa {SEA}	Found floating at surface, alive	Architeuthis sp.	Entire	Entire	Female (maturing–mature?)	ML: 1700 mm; LRL: 16.7 mm; URL: 17.0 mm; extensive measurements, illustrations, and description	SAM catalog no. S1868 [specimen SA-2 of Roeleveld (2000)]	Roeleveld & Lipiński (1991:433, pls.); Roeleveld (2000:185)		Found barely alive by Capt. Hennie Smith. Beak morphometrics studied by Roeleveld (2000).
217	October 1974	South African waters (28°00′S 14°11′E; given as "28°S 14°11'E") {SEA}	By trawl; taken by fisheries vessel	Architeuthis sp.	Entire	Piece of arm and tentacle		WT: 220 kg	SAM	Pérez-Gándaras & Guerra (1989:114)		
218	18 February 1975	Verdalsøra, Trondheimsfjorden, Norway {NEA}	Found washed ashore	Architeuthis sp.	Entire	Undetermined		TL: 7.96 m; WT: 68.9 kg		Holthe (1975:174)		
219	28 October 1975	Bonavista, Bonavista Bay, Newfoundland {NWA}	Found washed ashore	Architeuthis dux Steenstrup, 1857	Entire; eyes ruptured and lenses missing	None; discarded	Male (mature)	EL: 6.67 m; DML: 1.32 m; TL: 5.05 m; additional measurements	None; Aldrich specimen No. 11	Aldrich (1979a:66, fig.); Aldrich (1991:472, fig. 9A–D)	Aldrich (1980:57, fig. 3)	Mature male with hectocotylus and protruding penis filled with spermatophores. Made available to giant squid expert Frederick Aldrich primarily through efforts of Larry Templeman and Ray Goeff, both of Bonavista.
220	26 January 1976	off Joban District, Japan (36°39′N 141°51′E) {NWP}	From sperm whale stomach	Architeuthis japonica Pfeffer, 1912	Tentacle only	Undetermined		None		Okutani et al. (1976:85)	Ohsumi & Satake (1976)	From 10.6 m long male sperm whale (no. 56).
221	26 January 1976	off Joban District, Japan (36°40′N 141°53′E) {NWP}	From sperm whale stomach	Architeuthis japonica Pfeffer, 1912	Tentacle only	Undetermined		None		Okutani et al. (1976:85)	Ohsumi & Satake (1976)	From 11.7 m long male sperm whale (no. 58).
222	3 February 1976	off Joban District, Japan (36°44′N 141°33′E) {NWP}	From sperm whale stomach	Architeuthis japonica Pfeffer, 1912	Entire	Undetermined		ML: 58.5 cm		Okutani et al. (1976:85, pl. 7)	Ohsumi & Satake (1976)	From 13.0 m long male sperm whale (no. 75).
223	4 February 1976	off Joban District, Japan (36°46′N 141°58′E) {NWP}	From sperm whale stomach	Architeuthis japonica Pfeffer, 1912	Mantle only	Undetermined		None		Okutani et al. (1976:85)	Ohsumi & Satake (1976)	From 9.5 m long female sperm whale (no. 79).
224	March 1976	Wellington south coast, New Zealand {SWP}	Found washed ashore	Architeuthis sp.	Entire				NMNZ; photographs only	Förch (1998:106)		
225	August 1976	off Vancouver, Oregon, United States {NEP}	From sperm whale stomach	Architeuthis sp.	Entire?	Undetermined		ML: ~2 m		Nesis et al. (1985:523)		
226	September 1976	off South Africa (27°42′S 14°13′E) {SEA}	By trawl	Architeuthis sp.	Entire	Undetermined		WL: 4.5 m; WT: 200 kg; TL: ~6 m; ML: 195 cm; radula		Pérez-Gándaras & Guerra (1978:401, figs. 1–4)	Nesis et al. (1985:518)	Stomach contents analysed.
227	19 November 1977	Firth of Forth, North Berwick, Scotland (56°03.5′N 02°43′W) {NEA}	Found washed ashore	Architeuthis dux	Entire	Entire; dissected, parts preserved separately	Female	ML: 161 cm; HL: 43 cm; AL: 230 cm; TL: 440 cm; FL: 67 cm; FW: 55 cm	NMSZ catalog no. 1978090.1	Heppell (1977:63); Heppell (1978:89); Heppell & Smith (1983:34)	Collins (1998a:489)	
228	21 November 1977	Lance Cove, Trinity Bay, Newfoundland {NWA}	Found washed ashore	Architeuthis dux Steenstrup, 1857	Entire	None		Unknown size	None; Aldrich specimen No. 12	Aldrich (1991:472)		Report only; specimen not observed.
229	April 1978	Jiaonon, Shandong Province, China {NWP}	From sperm whale stomach	Architeuthis sp.	Beaks	Undetermined		None		Dong (1984:328, fig. 2.1)		From stranded sperm whale.
230	9 June 1978	Miura Peninsula, Japan {NWP}	Not stated	Architeuthis cf. japonica Pfeffer, 1912	Entire	Entire, missing fins, tentacles, and arm tips	Female	ML: 540 mm; AL(IV): 830 mm [longest arm IV, missing tip]	Keikyu Aburatsubo Marine Park	Kubodera & Yamada (2001:238, pl. 2A)		Specimen donated to aquarium by Kurihama Thermoelectric Power Plant. Tentatively assigned to A. japonica based on relative lengths of mantle and longest arm IV.
231	~15 June 1978	near Mack Arch, Oregon, North Pacific Ocean {NEP}	By trawl	Architeuthis sp.	Entire	Sucker rings		WT: 225 lb (102 kg)	SBMNH catalog no. 60119	[Anon.] (1978a); [Anon.] (1978b)		Caught by commercial fisherman G. Steffensmier.
232	21 June 1978	off Fort Lauderdale, United States (Straits of Florida) (26°10′N 80°00′W; given as "26°10'N 80°W") {NWA}	From fish stomach, Xiphias gladius (swordfish)	Architeuthis sp.	Entire, "mutilated specimen"	Entire	Male (mature)	ML: 167+ mm; GL: 179 mm; additional extensive description	RSMAS catalog no. UMML 31.1761 [specimen No. 9 of Roper et al. (2015)]	Toll & Hess (1981b:754, fig. 1); Roper et al. (2015:80)	Toll & Hess (1981a:768); Hess & Toll (1981:162, fig. 4); Roper (1992:99); Nesis (2001); Roeleveld (2002:736); Roper & Shea (2013:116)	From stomach of female swordfish (205 cm fork length). Very small mature specimen with spermatophores (subadult according to Roper & Shea, 2013). Toll & Hess (1981b) suggested it might be an undescribed dwarf species and Roeleveld (2002:736) wrote of this specimen: "It probably represents a distinct species and perhaps even a separate genus." Kir Nesis also thought it was probably a separate species and wrote that no new information on it had appeared in the 20 years since its original description.
233	July 1978	Gisborne, New Zealand {SWP}	Trawl capture	Architeuthis sp.	Entire					Förch (1998:106)	The Gisborne Herald (photographs)	
234 (📷)	late 1978	Cheyne Beach Whaling Station, Albany, Western Australia {SWP}	From sperm whale stomach	Architeuthis sp.	Two specimens	Undetermined		EL: 13 m [larger specimen]; WT: 240 or 280 kg [larger specimen]	Wallaroo Heritage and Nautical Museum, South Australia (smaller specimen)	[Anon.] (1980:27, fig.); Zeidler (1996:7)	Zeidler & Gowlett-Holmes (1996:85); Sea Frontiers	Caught by Cheynes Beach Whaling Co., Albany, Western Australia; recovered shortly before whaling station's closure in late 1978. Larger specimen used in promotional displays by Hugh Edwards and photographed at Perth Royal Show.
235	Unknown (reported 1979)	Noto, Ishikawa Prefecture, Japan {NWP}	In floating blanket net	Architeuthis sp.	Entire	Undetermined		TL: 5.5 m; WT: 97 kg		Satomi (1979)	Kitaguni Newspaper (photograph)	
236	1979	Newfoundland {NWA}	By trawl					EL: 31 ft (9.4 m)		Ellis (1998a:263) ["Stephen, pers. comm. (1997)"]		Captured by Spanish trawler.
237	20 August 1979	near Cortes Bank, California, United States, at 550 fathoms (1,010 m) depth {NEP}	From sablefish trap	Architeuthis japonica?	Tentacle only	Tentacle		None given	SBMNH catalog no. 60117	Sweeney & Roper (2001:[81]) ["Hochberg (in prep.)"]; Thomas (2006)		First recorded specimen from southern California according to Eric Hochberg of Santa Barbara Museum of Natural History.
238	19 November 1979	on beach, Saint Brendan's, Cottel's Island, Bonavista Bay, Newfoundland {NWA}	Found washed ashore	Architeuthis dux Steenstrup, 1857	Entire, in several pieces	None; discarded	Female (immature)	ML: 154 cm; additional measurements	None; Aldrich specimen No. 13	Aldrich (1979b:2, 2 figs.); Aldrich (1991:473)	Flynn & Weigall (1980); Aldrich (1982:2); Clarke (1992:72); Shirlow (2021:33, fig.)	Found by Martin Furlong of Saint Brendan's, who secured it with a line to prevent it being washed out to sea. Frederick Aldrich informed of find on 21 November; arrived at Memorial University of Newfoundland the following day. Featured in episode of 1980 documentary series Arthur C. Clarke's Mysterious World where date of stranding given as 22 November by Frederick Aldrich.
239	Unknown (reported 1980)	Oregon, United States {NEP}	Found washed ashore	Architeuthis japonica Pfeffer, 1912	Entire?	Undetermined		None		Hochberg & Fields (1980:434)	Nesis et al. (1985:523)	
240 (📷)	early February 1980	Plum Island, Massachusetts, United States; see map {NWA}	Found stranded on beach	Architeuthis sp.	Entire; missing eyes, tentacles, most arm tips, and reddish skin; lost when the squid washed ashore	Entire	Female	WL: 2.7 m; ML: ~2 m; EL: ~9/~10 m [estimate]; WT: 200 kg	NMNH catalog no. 814000 [specimen No. 10 of Roper et al. (2015)]	Roper & Boss (1982:96, 100, fig.); L. Sweeney (1983); Miller (1983:110, 2 figs.) (cover story); Clark (1983); Carroll (1983); Conley-Early (1995:48); Feldman (1996); Morris (2000); Whalen (2009); [Anon.] (2009); Roper et al. (2015:80)	Sarsby (2000); Wu (2018)	On public display. Nicknamed "Moby Squid" and "Archi". Removed from beach on stretcher by four men. Originally displayed at New England Aquarium. Given as gift to National Museum of Natural History (NMNH) in 1982; acquisition publicised in early 1983 at "Giant Squid Press Conference" led by giant squid expert Clyde Roper at NMNH, where displayed in "mammoth wooden bathtub" in 125 US gallons (470 L) of alcohol. Planned to be initially displayed in museum rotunda for several months before being dissected and studied. Collected for museum by Roper who flew in and moved it from Boston to Washington, D.C. in back of truck; recounted in episode of documentary series First Person in 2000. Featured in Smithsonian Institution's monthly newspaper, The Smithsonian Torch, in February 1983 and in 2000 documentary film Quest for the Giant Squid; subject of 1983 television short "The Smithsonian's Giant Squid". From 14 April 2009 displayed in 8-foot (2.4 m) fibreglass tank filled with ~300 US gallons (1,100 L) of isopropyl alcohol at Georgia Aquarium's Cold Water Quest Gallery, on loan from NMNH (planned for up to 2 years).
241	March–April 1980	about 250 miles (400 km) off California (34°39'–35°39'N 126°25'–127°28'W), North Pacific Ocean, at 25–40 to 90 m depth {NEP}	By trawl	Architeuthis sp.	18 entire specimens	Undetermined		ML: 50–77 cm (average: 62.5 cm); additional measurements, indices, and descriptions		Nesis et al. (1985:519, figs. 1–3)		Eighteen specimens taken in 9 trawls.
*	No date given	North Pacific (35°20′N 126°43′W) {NEP}		Architeuthis		Tentacles only		ML: ~500 mm [estimate]; TL: 1030/1570 mm; CL: 311/357 mm; CSC: 247/246; TSC: >273/>274; additional indices and counts	P. P. Shirshov Institute of Oceanology [specimen NP-33 of Roeleveld (2002)]	Nesis et al. (1985:519); Roeleveld (2002:727)		One of the 18 specimens from record #241. Tentacle morphology examined by Roeleveld (2002).
242	2 July 1980	1,500 miles (2,400 km) off Oregon, Northeast Pacific (42°35′N 148°35′W) at 15 m depth {NEP}	By pelagic trawl	Architeuthis sp.	Entire	Entire, minus arms and tentacles		ML: 164 cm [fresh]; FL: 75 cm [fresh]; FW: 43 cm [fresh]; description of thawed plus preserved specimen	ZMMGU	Nesis et al. (1985:518)		Taken by R/V Novoul'yanovsk with 133 m pelagic trawl.
243	1980	off New South Wales coast, Eastern Australia {SWP}	From smooth hammerhead stomach, Sphyrna zygaena	Architeuthis sp.	Beak	Undetermined		ML: 706 mm [estimate]		Dunning et al. (1993:124)		
244	1980	Vertical de Cudillero, Asturias, Spain {NEA}	Not specified	Architeuthis dux	At least a tentacle			WT: 100 kg [tentacle only?]		Guerra et al. (2006:258)		Attempt made to haul aboard a tentacle weighing 100 kg [?], but material was discarded upon observation of its poor state. Seen from the ship Oñaegea.
245	20 August 1980	South African waters {SEA}	By trawl; taken by fisheries vessel	Architeuthis sp.	Entire	None		ML: 0.81 m		Pérez-Gándaras & Guerra (1989:114)		
246	21 October 1980	Patton Escarpment, California, United States (32°28′30″N 120°15′48″W) at 500–600 m depth {NEP}	By RMT-8 midwater trawl	Architeuthis sp.	Tentacle club and stalk	Tentacle club and stalk		TL: 4.27 m; CL: 41.5 cm; DC: 15.3 cm; MaL: 24.5 cm; LSD: 1.85 cm	SBMNH catalog no. 60120	Robison (1989:39, figs. 1–2)	Packham (1998); Grann (2004)	Severed from live animal; tissue still elastic and responsive to mechanical stimulation, exhibiting grasping suckers and chromatophore contraction. Provided direct evidence for depth of occurrence. Chemical analysis carried out by Robison (1989); composition suggestive of "relatively strong swimming capability" and buoyancy due to high ammonium concentration. Flesh tasted by Robison who described it as "bitter". Featured in episode of 1998 documentary series The X Creatures.
247	February 1981	Kāne'ohe Bay, Oahu, Hawaiian Islands {NEP}	By hook and line	Architeuthis sp.	Entire	Beak plus piece of flesh		?WL: 20 ft (6.1 m)	Undetermined	Higa (1981:9)		Taken alive while trolling by M. Yoshida and D. Maeda; attacked by false killer whale during retrieval.
248 (📷)	10 February 1981	~10 miles (16 km) offshore from Kahana Bay, Oahu, Hawaii {NEP}	Caught by fisherman	"likely to be of the genus Architeuthis"	At least head and arms; skin and eye(s) intact		(adult)	EyD: at least 270 mm [estimate]; pupil diameter: 90 mm [estimate]		Nilsson et al. (2012:683, fig. 1)		Caught by fisherman Henry Olsen. Photograph of freshly caught specimen taken by Ernie Choy at pier shows head with undamaged eye; used by Nilsson et al. (2012) to estimate eye and pupil diameter on basis of standard fuel hose visible in frame (findings of paper summarised by Partridge, 2012; challenged by Schmitz, 2013; Schmitz et al., 2013a, b; defended by Nilsson et al., 2013).
249	20 May 1981	Vavilov Ridge, Southeast Atlantic (7°56′S 0°57′E) at 400–470 m depth {SEA}	By 110 m cable-trawl	Architeuthis sp.	Entire	Tentacles plus part of viscera; remainder lost		TL: 420 + 400 cm [fresh]; TL: 287 + 269 cm [fixed]; additional counts, measurements, and description	Undetermined	Nesis et al. (1985:522)		Taken by R/V Novoukrainka.
250	1981	Asturias, Spain {NEA}	Not specified	Architeuthis dux	Entire?			?EL: 10 m		Guerra et al. (2006:258)		Displayed in a Gijón fish shop before being sold at a market in Avilés.
251	3 August 1981	Orange River mouth, Southeast Atlantic (27°45′S 10°45′E) at 18–95 m depth {SEA}	By trawl	Architeuthis sp.	Entire	Entire		ML: 81 cm; TL: 364 cm; WT: 11.8 kg	Undetermined	Nesis et al. (1985:522)		Taken by R/V Novoukrainka.
252	7 September 1981	Azores Islands {NEA}	From sperm whale stomach	Architeuthis sp.	Lower beak	Undetermined		LRL: 14.1 mm		Clarke (1986:fig. 22b)		
253	11 October 1981	Tasman Sea (33°19.4′S 155°00.3′E) at 20 m depth {SWP}	By trawl	Architeuthis sp.	Entire	Entire	Larva	ML: 10.3 mm	NMV	Lu (1986:9, fig.); Roper (1992:99, fig. 161)	Zeidler & Gowlett-Holmes (1996:85); Roper & Shea (2013:116)	Captured by FRV Soela at 1450 hours.
254 (📷)	10 November 1981	Hare Bay, Bonavista Bay, Newfoundland {NWA}	Found washed ashore	Architeuthis dux Steenstrup, 1857	Entire, in remarkably good condition; skin, tentacles and eye(s) intact	Entire	Female (immature)	ML: 159 cm; EL: 32 or 42 ft (9.8 or 12.8 m) [when found]; EL: 29 ft (8.8 m) [as of 2009]; WT: 250–300 lb (110–140 kg) (or ~120 kg); additional measurements	The Rooms catalog no. MO-1692. Aldrich specimen No. 14	Aldrich (1982:2, fig.); Aldrich (1991:473); [The Rooms] (2007:12); Bourque (2009); [Anon.] (c. 2014)		On public display. Stranded by receding tide around 11:30 a.m.; found in 30 cm of water adjacent to the property of David Lush, who came upon it while walking with his young daughter Kelly. Lush and Ray Collins brought it to the attention of Frederick Aldrich, via Jon Lien. Viewed on beach by staff and students of Jane Collins Academy, one of whom photographed specimen in situ. Transported to the Memorial University of Newfoundland where it arrived on morning of 11 November, and dissected there on 12 November. Vivid chromatophoric colour change observed in the form of waves and flashes, and suckers of manal (central) portion of tentacular club still functioned. Eye was "relatively intact" and included lens; described by Aldrich as "first ever collected". Stellate ganglion and associated giant axon dissected out by neuroscientist Don Geduldig. Alimentary canal free of food remains. Donated by Aldrich to the Natural History Branch of the old Newfoundland Museum in 1987. Originally preserved in 300-litre tank. On 18 November 2007, following minor repairs (arms sewn up and loose skin removed), specimen was transferred to an 800-gallon (3,600 L) tank filled with propylene glycol at The Rooms, where it could be exhibited with tentacles fully extended.
255	Christmas 1981	Playa de Luarca, Asturias, Spain {NEA}	Found washed ashore on beach	Architeuthis dux	Entire?; poor condition					Guerra et al. (2006:258)		Found by Secundino González and Manuel Pico.
256	1981–1984	Azores {NEA}	From sperm whale stomachs	Architeuthis ?dux Steenstrup, 1860	Beaks	Undetermined		WT: 23 kg [estimated average]; ML: 1 m [estimated average]		Clarke et al. (1993:71)		Found in stomach contents of 76.5% of 17 sperm whales sampled during 1981–1984.
257	30 January 1982	off New South Wales, Australia (33°44′S 153°00′E) from surface to 600 m depth {SWP}	By oblique pelagic trawl	Architeuthis sp.	Entire	Undetermined	Female (juvenile)	ML: 42.2 cm		Jackson et al. (1991:331)	Zeidler & Gowlett-Holmes (1996:85); Roper & Shea (2013:116)	
258	July 1982	North Canterbury, New Zealand {SWP}	Trawl capture	Architeuthis sp.	Entire	Partial club			NMNZ; NMNZ M77446	Förch (1998:106)		
259	23 August 1982	off shore, Radøy (near Bergen), Norway {NEA}	By hook and line, caught alive	Architeuthis monachus (Steenstrup in Harting, 1860)	Entire	Undetermined		EL: ~10 m; TL: ~7.3 m; WT: ~220 kg	ZMUB?	Brix (1983:422, fig. 1)	Brix et al. (1989:34); Hoving et al. (2006:158)	Caught in 5 m deep bay; dying at time of capture. Blood study by Brix et al. (1989).
260 (📷)	September 1982	Fladen Ground, northern North Sea, c. 100 miles (160 km) northeast of Aberdeen, Scotland (c. 59°N 0.5°E), depth unknown but 100–150 m in area [or: north of Dogger Bank, North Sea (55°30′N 3°00′E; given as "55°30'N 3°E")] {NEA}	By trawl	Architeuthis spec.; Architeuthis dux	Entire; most of viscera missing, posterior tail and fins cut off, small piece of testis present, fragments of reddish membrane (which normally covers viscera) present, spermatangia deeply implanted in left arm IV (180–350 mm from base)	Entire	Male (mature?)	ML: 900 mm; MT: 22 mm [maximum]; WT: ≥18 kg [much lower than fresh mass]; AL(I): 700+/750+ mm; AL(II): 610+/870+ mm; AL(III): 980+/790+ mm; AL(IV): 830+/940+ mm; TL: 810+/1040+ mm; EyD: 80 mm; GiL: 250 mm; FuD: 55 mm; FuCL: 115 mm; ASD: 15 mm [largest]; [measurements taken after almost 25 years of preservation in formalin]	RMNH catalog nos. RMNH.MOL.92511 & 111016	Hoving et al. (2006:153); [Naturalis] (c. 2012); [Naturalis] (2015b); [Naturalis] (2016)		On public display. Caught by beam trawler Urk 56, operating from IJmuiden harbour; purchased from F. Sievertsen. First giant squid caught by Dutch fishermen. Probably mature, having spermatangia (inverted spermatophores) implanted in ventral arm. Exhibited at Naturalis Biodiversity Center, Leiden in formalin or 70% alcohol.
261	October 1982	off Japan (44°N 152°E) at 150–200 m depth {NWP}	Caught by squid-fishing boat	Architeuthis japonica	Entire	Entire?		ML: 2.1 m; EL: 8.1 m; AC: 31 cm; WT: 163 kg [without viscera]		Iida et al. (1992:2384)		Stored frozen at −25 °C. Identified by Takashi Okutani, then of Tokai-ku Fisheries Research Institute. Chemical composition of arm and mantle tissue analysed by Iida et al. (1992).
262	30 October 1982	Sandy Cove, Fogo Island, Notre Dame Bay, Newfoundland {NWA}	Found washed ashore	Architeuthis dux Steenstrup, 1857	Entire, in poor condition	Entire?	Female	ML: 169 cm; additional measurements	NMSJ catalog no. MO-1693. Aldrich specimen No. 15	Aldrich (1991:474, fig. 10)		"Had engaged in battle with what apparently was another cephalopod".
263	30 December 1982	Kuzuareyama coast of Noh-machi, Niigata Prefecture, Japan {NWP}	Found washed ashore	Architeuthis japonica Pfeffer, 1912	Entire	Undetermined		?WL: 3.98 m; WT: 120 kg		Honma et al. (1983:23, fig. 1)		
264	1983	Las Tiberas, Asturias, Spain {NEA}	Not specified	Architeuthis dux				WT: 150 kg [dead]		Guerra et al. (2006:258)		Collected by "El Dioni" of Avilés.
265	19 August 1983	west coast of North Island, New Zealand (39°03′S 174°04′E) {SWP}	Found washed ashore	Architeuthis kirkii Robson, 1887	Entire	None	Female (immature)	ML: 2035 mm; HL: ~0.5 m; WT: >200 kg; ASD: 23 mm	NMNZ; NMNZ M79971. Gauldie et al. specimen No. 1	Gauldie et al. (1994:94); Förch (1983:6, fig.); Förch (1998:specimen 1)	Judd (1996)	Found stuck in filtering screens of cooling water intake of New Plymouth power station. Specimen "appeared to be a different species" from next New Zealand carcass (#267).
266	8–9 January 1984	Cove Bay (near Aberdeen), Scotland {NEA}	Found washed ashore	Architeuthis cf. dux	Entire	Undetermined	Female	WL: ~4.23 m; ML: ~1.75 m; GL: 1.57 m; BC: 1.40 m; HC: 0.88 m; WT: ~168 kg; ED: <0.5–<1.0 mm		Nixon (1984:4); Boyle (1986:81)	Boyle (1984:12); Collins (1998a:489)	Tested for buoyancy. Egg count estimated at >10 million.
267	8 March 1984	Auckland Islands (51°16′S 166°52′E) at 533 m depth {SWP}	By trawl	Architeuthis kirkii Robson, 1887	Entire	Undetermined	Female	ML: 1930 mm; no other measurements	None?; Gauldie et al. specimen No. 2	Gauldie et al. (1994:94); Förch (1998:specimen 2)	Judd (1996); O'Shea (2007)	Caught by F/V Shinkai Maru. Specimen "appeared to be a different species" from previous New Zealand carcass (#265).
268	12 April 1984	southeast coast of North Island, New Zealand (41°11′S 176°44′E) at 870–1100 m depth {SWP}	By trawl	Architeuthis kirkii Robson, 1887	Entire	Undetermined	Female	ML: 930 mm; no other measurements	None?; Gauldie et al. specimen No. 3	Gauldie et al. (1994:94); Förch (1998:specimen 5)	O'Shea (2007)	
269	April 1984	3 miles (4.8 km) from Tazones, Asturias, Spain {NEA}	By trawl	Architeuthis dux	Entire?			WL: 3–4 m		Guerra et al. (2006:258)		Captured by Antonio Coro.
270	3 May 1984	near Castlepoint lighthouse, east coast of the North Island of New Zealand (40°54′S 176°14′E) {SWP}	Found floating	Architeuthis kirkii Robson, 1887	Entire	Undetermined	Female	ML: 1770 mm; no other measurements	None?; Gauldie et al. specimen No. 4	Gauldie et al. (1994:94); Förch (1998:specimen 3)	Judd (1996)	Specimen "brought to the Ministry of Agriculture and Fisheries in Wellington on the back of a ute by a rock lobster fisherman", who initially thought it was "a large floating plastic bag" but noticed it was being attacked by gulls. Many features said to be intermediate between those of #265 and 267.
271	9 May 1984	Cape Palliser, Wellington, New Zealand {SWP}	Found washed ashore	Architeuthis sp.	Entire?	Undetermined		None		[Anon.] (1984:1); Stevens (1988:150)		Site of stranding close (within 4–8 km) to head of Wairarapa submarine canyon.
272 (📷)	12 May 1984	Princess Bay beach, Wellington, New Zealand (41°17′S 174°47′E) {SWP}	Found washed ashore	Architeuthis kirkii Robson, 1887	Entire	Undetermined	Female	ML: 1825 mm; no other measurements	None?; catalog no. M79974; Gauldie et al. specimen No. 5 [specimen No. 4 of Förch (1998)]	[Anon.] (1984:1, fig.); Gauldie et al. (1994:94); Förch (1998:specimen 4, frontispiece pl., figs. 3A, 7A–B, 12A)	Stevens (1988:150, fig. 3); Nesis (2001, fig.)	Collected by Ms. Kylie Solomon and Mr. Rangi Solomon. Site of stranding close (within 4–8 km) to head of Nicholson submarine canyon.
273	May 1984	Namibia, South African waters {SEA}	By trawl	Architeuthis sp.	Entire	Undetermined		ML: 1250 mm[?]; WT: 38 kg; MW: 390 mm; HW: 250 mm; FL: 570 mm; FW: 280 mm[?]; TL: 4750 mm		Pérez-Gándaras & Guerra (1989:115)		Taken by fisheries vessel.
274	June 1984	Chub Cay, Bahamas (25°24.25′N 77°55′W) {NWA}	Found dying at surface; not collected	Architeuthis dux	Entire; tentacles missing	None		WL: 400 cm; WT: 114 lb (52 kg)	None [specimen No. 11 of Roper et al. (2015)]	Roper et al. (2015:80)		Identified based on photo.
275	June 1984	west coast hoki grounds, South Island, New Zealand {SWP}	By trawl	Architeuthis sp.	Entire					Förch (1998:106)		Caught by F/V Arrow.
276	1984	Cal. Sierra d Oviedo, Asturias, Spain {NEA}	From shark stomach	Architeuthis dux	Severed tentacle			TC: >10 cm		Guerra et al. (2006:258)		
277	25 July 1984	northwest coast of South Island, New Zealand (41°05′S 170°52′E) at 475 m depth {SWP}	By trawl	Architeuthis kirkii Robson, 1887	Entire	Entire	Female	ML: 1560 mm; TL: 7500 mm [right]; CSC: 250 [right]; additional indices and counts	NMNZ; NMNZ M.86826; Gauldie et al. specimen No. 6 [specimen NZ-6 of Roeleveld (2002)]	Gauldie et al. (1994:94); Förch (1998:specimen 6); Roeleveld (2002:727)	O'Shea (2007)	Tentacle morphology examined by Roeleveld (2002).
278	24 September 1984	southwest coast of South Island, New Zealand (46°18′S 166°30′E) at 365 m depth {SWP}	By trawl	Architeuthis kirkii Robson, 1887	Entire	Entire	Female	ML: 2020 mm; TL: 6325/7250 mm; CL: 925/925 mm; CSC: 287/287; TSC: 310/310; additional indices and counts	NMNZ; NMNZ M.79976; Gauldie et al. specimen No. 7 [specimen NZ-7 of Roeleveld (2002)]	Gauldie et al. (1994:94); Förch (1998:specimen 7); Roeleveld (2002:727)	O'Shea (2007)	Caught by F/V Tengawai. Tentacle morphology examined by Roeleveld (2002).
279	Unknown (sampled during 1984–1990)	San Miguel Island, California, United States {NEP}	From northern elephant seal stomach, Mirounga angustirostris	Architeuthis japonica Pfeffer, 1912	Beaks	Undetermined		None		Antonelis et al. (1994:214)		From three northern elephant seals, sampled during 1984–1990.
280	6 June 1985	New Zealand (47°04′S 169°32′E) at 310 m depth {SWP}	By trawl	Architeuthis sp.	Entire		Female	ML: ~2000 mm		Förch (1998:106)	O'Shea (2007)	Caught by F/V Daishin Maru 23.
281	23 July 1985	off New Zealand; see map {SWP}	Unspecified record	Architeuthis sp.	Larva(e)			Larva(e)		O'Shea (N.d.)		
282	31 July 1985	off New Zealand; see map {SWP}	Unspecified record	Architeuthis sp.	Larva(e)			Larva(e)		O'Shea (N.d.)		
283	26 August 1985	off New Zealand; see map {SWP}	Unspecified record	Architeuthis sp.	Larva(e)			Larva(e)		O'Shea (N.d.)		
284	28 August 1985	off New Zealand; see map {SWP}	Unspecified record	Architeuthis sp.	Larva(e)			Larva(e)		O'Shea (N.d.)		
285	29 August 1985	off New Zealand; see map {SWP}	Unspecified record	Architeuthis sp.	Larva(e)			Larva(e)		O'Shea (N.d.)		
286	1 September 1985	off New Zealand; see map {SWP}	Unspecified record	Architeuthis sp.	Larva(e)			Larva(e)		O'Shea (N.d.)		
287	Unknown (reported 1986)	Unknown {?}	From sperm whale stomach	Architeuthis sp.	Buccal mass and beak	Beak		LRL: 18.8 mm	Undetermined	Clarke (1986:fig. 22a)		From sperm whale stomach (G17A65).
288	Unknown (reported 1986)	South Africa {SEA}	From sperm whale stomach	Architeuthis sp.	Lower beak	Beak		LRL: 17.2 mm	Undetermined	Clarke (1986:fig. 23)		
289	Unknown (reported 1986)	Azores Islands {NEA}	Not stated	Architeuthis sp.	Lower beak	Lower beak		ML: 1980 mm; LRL: 19.4 mm	Undetermined	Clarke (1986:fig. 24a)		
290	29 January 1986	off Aberdeen, Scotland {NEA}	By trawl	Architeuthis cf. dux	Entire	None; sold commercially		WL: 2.98 m; ML: 1.45 m; BC: 1.10 m; AC: 0.22 m; WT: ~90 kg		Boyle (1986:82)	Collins (1998a:489)	Caught by fishing vessel; measurements by Mr. G. Howard.
291	March 1986	near mouth of Orange River, South Africa (27°52′S 14°40′E) at 510–550 m depth {SEA}	By bottom trawl	Architeuthis sp.	Entire	Entire	Female (maturing)	ML: 1680 mm; LRL: 17.4 mm; URL: 17.1 mm; extensive measurements, illustrations, and description	SAM catalog no. S1681 [specimen SA-3 of Roeleveld (2000)]	Roeleveld & Lipiński (1991:433, pls.); Roeleveld (2000:185)		Taken by MT Pardelhas. Beak morphometrics studied by Roeleveld (2000).
292	31 March 1986	Auckland Islands (50°50′S 166°51′E) at 296 m depth {SWP}	By trawl	Architeuthis kirkii Robson, 1887	Entire	Undetermined	Female	ML: 1720 mm; no other measurements	None?; Gauldie et al. specimen No. 8	Gauldie et al. (1994:94); Förch (1998:specimen 11)	O'Shea (2007)	Caught by F/V Akebono Maru 73.
293	11 April 1986	northeast coast of North Island, New Zealand (35°43′S 174°20′E) {SWP}	Found floating	Architeuthis kirkii Robson, 1887	Entire	Undetermined	Male	ML: 1260 mm; no other measurements	None?; Gauldie et al. specimen No. 9	Gauldie et al. (1994:94); Förch (1998:specimen 9)		
294	17 April 1986	east coast of South Island, New Zealand (43°38′S 174°43′E) at 470 m depth {SWP}	By trawl	Architeuthis kirkii Robson, 1887	Entire	Entire	Female	ML: 1815 mm; TL: 3150/3110 mm; CSC: 257/248; TSC: 279 [right]; additional indices and counts	NMNZ; Gauldie et al. specimen No. 10 [specimen NZ-12 of Roeleveld (2002)]	Gauldie et al. (1994:94); Förch (1998:specimen 12); Roeleveld (2002:727)	O'Shea (2007)	Caught by F/V Banshu Maru 8. Tentacle morphology examined by Roeleveld (2002).
295	27 May 1986	southwest coast of South Island, New Zealand (46°32′S 166°11′E) at 604 m depth {SWP}	By trawl	Architeuthis kirkii Robson, 1887	Entire	Entire	Female	ML: 1830 mm; CL: 840 mm; additional indices and counts	NMNZ; Gauldie et al. specimen No. 11 [specimen NZ-13 of Roeleveld (2002)]	Gauldie et al. (1994:94); Förch (1998:specimen 13); Roeleveld (2002:727)	O'Shea (2007)	Caught by F/V Daishin Maru 28. O'Shea (2007) gives date as 27 April. Tentacle morphology examined by Roeleveld (2002).
296	third week of July 1986	Newfoundland {NWA}	Not stated	Architeuthis?	Entire?; "rotting"			None		Aldrich (1991:460)		Reported by T. Matthews of the Department of the Environment at Bristol's Hope, Conception Bay. "No information on the specimen has been obtained, save that it was in "rotting" condition".
297	17 July 1986 (also reported as 19 July)	Randalls Bay, at mouth of Huon River, near Cygnet, Tasmania, Australia {SWP}	Found washed ashore	Architeuthis	Entire?	None; not collected		None given		[TMAG] (2007:18)	Trivedi (2002); [Anon.] (2007a)	Found on beach.
298	18 July 1986	west coast of South Island, New Zealand (42°03′S 170°26′E) at 450/500 m depth {SWP}	By trawl	Architeuthis kirkii Robson, 1887	Entire	Undetermined		ML: 1380 mm; WT: 43.5 kg; see Förch (1998:110)	None?; Gauldie et al. specimen No. 12	Gauldie et al. (1994:94); Förch (1998:107)	O'Shea (2007)	Caught by F/V Dolomit.
299	8 September 1986	east coast of South Island, New Zealand (43°43′S 174°56′E) at 480 m depth {SWP}	By trawl	Architeuthis kirkii Robson, 1887	Entire	Undetermined	Female	ML: 2140 mm; no other measurements	None?; Gauldie et al. specimen No. 13	Gauldie et al. (1994:94); Förch (1998:specimen 14)	O'Shea (2007)	Caught by F/V Banshu Maru 8.
300	26 February 1987	east coast of South Island, New Zealand (44°09′S 173°44′E) at 350 m depth {SWP}	By trawl	Architeuthis kirkii Robson, 1887	Entire	Entire	Male [female?]	ML: 1900 mm; CL: 755 mm; CSC: 222; additional indices and counts	NMNZ; Gauldie et al. specimen No. 14 [specimen NZ-8 of Roeleveld (2002)]	Gauldie et al. (1994:94); Förch (1998:specimen 8); Roeleveld (2002:727)	O'Shea (2007)	Caught by F/V Daishin Maru 22. Roeleveld (2002) and O'Shea (2007) give coordinates of 44°09′S 173°35′E and O'Shea (2007) gives depth of 312–356 m. Tentacle morphology examined by Roeleveld (2002).
301	5 March 1987	off Shetland Islands {NEA}	By trawl	Architeuthis sp.		Undetermined		ML: 1100 mm		Collins (1998a:489)		
302	April–July 1987	approximately 40°S 120°W, South Pacific {SEP}	By trawl	Architeuthis sp.	Eight juveniles	Undetermined	(juveniles)	None		Alexeyev (1994:156, map)		Taken in subantarctic waters by R/V Vozrozhdeniye, cruise XI.
303	3 May 1987	southeast coast of North Island, New Zealand (41°31′S 176°43′E) at 360 m depth {SWP}	By trawl	Architeuthis kirkii Robson, 1887	Entire	Undetermined	Female	ML: 1610 mm; no other measurements	None?; Gauldie et al. specimen No. 15	Gauldie et al. (1994:94)	Förch (1998:107); O'Shea (2007)	Listed in table as 3 April. Used for statolith study.
304	9 May 1987	east coast of South Island, New Zealand (43°38′S 174°14′E) at 506 m depth {SWP}	By trawl	Architeuthis kirkii Robson, 1887	Entire	Undetermined	Female	ML: 2135 mm; no other measurements	None?; Gauldie et al. specimen No. 16	Gauldie et al. (1994:94); Förch (1998:specimen 15)	O'Shea (2007)	Caught by F/V Daishin Maru 28.
305	1987	near Sydney, Australia {SWP}	By trawl?	Architeuthis sp.	Entire?	Undetermined		WT: 150 kg		Gannon (1996)		"150 kg monster landed near Sydney in 1987"
306	19 July 1987	off New Zealand; see map {SWP}	Unspecified record	Architeuthis sp.	Larva(e)			Larva(e)		O'Shea (N.d.)		
307	20 July 1987	off New Zealand; see map {SWP}	Unspecified record	Architeuthis sp.	Larva(e)			Larva(e)		O'Shea (N.d.)		
308	26 July 1987	west coast of South Island, New Zealand (42°35′S 170°23′E) at 503 m depth {SWP}	By trawl	Architeuthis kirkii Robson, 1887	Entire	Undetermined		ML: 1300 mm; see Förch (1998:110)	None?; Gauldie et al. specimen No. 17	Gauldie et al. (1994:94); Förch (1998:107)	O'Shea (2007)	Caught by F/V Zuiyo 3.
309	26 July 1987	off New Zealand; see map {SWP}	Unspecified record	Architeuthis sp.	Larva(e)			Larva(e)		O'Shea (N.d.)		
310	28 July 1987	off New Zealand; see map {SWP}	Unspecified record	Architeuthis sp.	Larva(e)			Larva(e)		O'Shea (N.d.)		
311	16 August 1987	west coast of South Island, New Zealand (41°21′S 170°30′E) at 464 m depth {SWP}	By trawl	Architeuthis kirkii Robson, 1887	Entire	Undetermined		ML: 1370 mm; WT: 70 kg; no other measurements	None?; Gauldie et al. specimen No. 18	Gauldie et al. (1994:94)	Förch (1998:108); O'Shea (2007)	Caught by F/V Zuiyo 3.
312	25 August 1987	west coast of South Island, New Zealand (41°31′S 170°34′E) at 410–608 m depth {SWP}	By trawl	Architeuthis kirkii Robson, 1887	Entire	Undetermined	Female	ML: 1230 mm; see Förch (1998:110)	None?; Gauldie et al. specimen No. 19	Gauldie et al. (1994:94); Förch (1998:108)	O'Shea (2007)	
313	2 September 1987	east of Auckland Islands (51°18′S 170°23′E) {SWP}	By trawl	Architeuthis kirkii Robson, 1887	Entire	Undetermined		ML: 1780 mm; see Förch (1998:110)	None?; Gauldie et al. specimen No. 20	Gauldie et al. (1994:94); Förch (1998:108)	O'Shea (2007)	Caught by F/V Mys Kronotsky.
314	13 October 1987	south coast of South Island, New Zealand (46°24′S 166°23′E) at 487 m depth {SWP}	By trawl	Architeuthis kirkii Robson, 1887	Entire	Undetermined		ML: 1770 mm; see Förch (1998:110)	None?; Gauldie et al. specimen No. 21	Gauldie et al. (1994:94); Förch (1998:108)	O'Shea (2007)	Caught by F/V Chiyo Maru 2.
315	October 1987	South African waters (29°46′S 14°43′E) {SEA}	By trawl	Architeuthis sp.	Entire	Undetermined		ML: 1790 mm[?]; WT: 130 kg; MW: 485 mm; HW: 240 mm; FL: 720 mm; FW: 360 mm		Pérez-Gándaras & Guerra (1989:115)		Taken by fisheries vessel.
316	4 November 1987	south coast of South Island, New Zealand (47°32′S 169°10′E) {SWP}	By trawl	Architeuthis kirkii Robson, 1887	Entire	Undetermined		ML: 2010 mm; see Förch (1998:110)	None?; Gauldie et al. specimen No. 22	Gauldie et al. (1994:94); Förch (1998:108)	O'Shea (2007)	Caught by F/V Chiyo Maru.
317	5 November 1987	southwest coast of South Island, New Zealand (46°31′S 166°30′E) at 550 m depth {SWP}	By trawl	Architeuthis kirkii Robson, 1887	Entire	Undetermined		ML: 1770 mm; no other measurements	None?; Gauldie et al. specimen No. 23	Gauldie et al. (1994:94)	Förch (1998:108); O'Shea (2007)	Caught by F/V Chiyo Maru 2.
318	26 November 1987	off New Zealand (47°29′S 169°35′E) at 540 m depth {SWP}		Architeuthis						O'Shea (2007)		
319	5 December 1987	New Zealand (47°28′S 169°35′E) at 540 m depth {SWP}	By trawl	Architeuthis sp.	Entire			WT: ~80 kg		Förch (1998:108)	O'Shea (2007)	Caught by F/V Chiyo Maru 2.
320	6 December 1987	New Zealand (47°30′S 169°19′E) at 550 m depth {SWP}	By trawl	Architeuthis sp.	Entire			WT: ~20 kg		Förch (1998:108)	O'Shea (2007)	Caught by F/V Chiyo Maru 2.
321	late 1987	hoki grounds, South Island, New Zealand {SWP}	By trawl	Architeuthis sp.	Entire	Undetermined	Female	ML: 1830 mm; no other measurements	None?; Förch specimen No. 10	Förch (1998:107)		
322	25 January 1988	Auckland Islands (51°00′S 166°42′E) at 495 m depth {SWP}	By trawl	Architeuthis kirkii Robson, 1887	Entire	Undetermined		ML: 1880 mm; WT: ~150 kg; see Förch (1998:110)	None?; Gauldie et al. specimen No. 24	Gauldie et al. (1994:94); Förch (1998:108)	O'Shea (2007)	Caught by F/V Nikolaevskiy Korabel. O'Shea (2007) gives date as 25 December.
323 (📷)	16 April 1988	Uradome coast, Shirohara, Iwami-cho, Tottori Prefecture, Japan {NWP}	Found stranded in shallow water, alive	Architeuthis dux	Entire, good condition; red skin and tentacles intact, most arm tips missing	Entire	Probably female (maturity unknown)	EL: 6959 mm; DML: 1309 mm; MW: 383 mm; Mantle perimeter: 878 mm; FL: 540 mm; FW: 325 mm; HL: 350 mm; HW: 193 mm; TL: 5218/5300 mm; TCL: 703/773 mm; TSD: 20 mm [maximum]; AL(I): 1211/1492 mm; AL(II): 1781/1096 mm; AL(III): 1549/1458 mm; AL(IV): 1343/1507 mm; WT: ~80 kg; extensive additional measurements and counts	Tottori Prefectural Museum; TRPM-A-595-0201-01	Nomura (1988:26); Tamura (1995:481); [Anon.] (2006); Wada et al. (2014:67, figs. 1–4); Shimada et al. (2017:9)	[Tottori] (2006); [Suiso] (N.d.)	On public display. Photographed in shallow water by Yasuke Yamane. Exhibited at Tottori Prefectural Museum since 21 June 1988, preserved in formalin; oldest specimen on public display in Japan. Displayed in 4 m × 0.7 m × 0.7 m tank on inclined surface so both sides can be viewed. Formed part of ground floor exhibit at Misawa Airport between 15 and 30 July 2006. Removed from old tank and examined in detail on 19 March 2013.
324	28 July 1988	off New Zealand; see map {SWP}	Unspecified record	Architeuthis sp.	Larva(e)			Larva(e)		O'Shea (N.d.)		
325	29 July 1988	off New Zealand; see map {SWP}	Unspecified record	Architeuthis sp.	Larva(e)			Larva(e)		O'Shea (N.d.)		
326	31 July 1988	off New Zealand; see map {SWP}	Unspecified record	Architeuthis sp.	Larva(e)			Larva(e)		O'Shea (N.d.)		
327	12 March 1989	Namibia (26°07′S 13°41′E) {SEA}	By trawl	Architeuthis sp.	Entire	Only tentacle clubs, hectocotylus, genitalia, beaks, and statolith	Male (mature)	ML: 1220 mm [fresh]; FL: 540 mm [thawed]; FW: 460 mm [thawed]; MW: 460 mm [thawed]; TL: 5060 + 4510 mm [thawed]; WT: 41,350 g [thawed]; other measurements	ICM?	Villanueva & Sánchez (1993:33)		
	1989	north of Cortes Bank, California, United States, at 1,800 ft (550 m) depth {NEP}	By trawl	Architeuthis japonica?	Tentacle piece	Not stated		None given		Thomas (2006)		
328	August 1989	South Shore, Bermuda (~32°12′N 64°53′W) {NWA}	Found floating at surface	Architeuthis dux	Entire?, "relatively good condition"			ML: 95 cm	[specimen No. 12 of Roper et al. (2015)]	Roper et al. (2015:80)		
329	September 1989	Santa Catarina State, Brazil (27°24′S 45°37′W) {SWA}	Found floating at surface	Architeuthis sp.			Female	ML: 151 cm	Instituto de Pesca, Santos, Brazil	Arfelli et al. (1991:83, figs. 2–3)	Ré et al. (1998:109)	
330	7 February 1990	Poipu, Kauai, Hawaiian Islands {NEP}	From sperm whale stomach	Architeuthis sp.	Lower beaks	Undetermined				Clarke & Young (1998:625)		From stranded 7250 kg male sperm whale.
331	10 February 1990	Long Rock, Penzance, Cornwall, England {NEA}	From stomach of stranded sperm whale	Architeuthis spp.	47 beaks	Beaks?			Undetermined	Clarke & Pascoe (1997:1256)	Roper & Shea (2013:112)	From 46 ft (14 m) male sperm whale. Giant squid accounted for 43% by number and estimated 80% by weight of total stomach contents. Possibly largest number of giant squid beaks found in a single whale stomach.
332	19 July 1990	West Cove, San Miguel Island, California, United States {NEP}	From northern elephant seal stomach, Mirounga angustirostris	Architeuthis japonica Pfeffer, 1912	Beaks	One lower beak		None	NMML catalog no. 486	Fiscus (1993:94)		From male northern elephant seal (specimen no. Y1991/1992).
333 (📷)	14 March 1991	Soetwater, near Slangkop Lighthouse, Kommetjie (Cape Peninsula), South Africa {SEA}	Found washed ashore	Architeuthis sp.	Entire; tentacles missing, arms incomplete	Entire	Female (mature)	ML: 1850 mm; statolith; LRL: 16.2 mm [estimate]; URL: 16.5 mm; additional beak measurements	SAM catalog no. S2486 [specimen SA-4 of Roeleveld (2000)]	Lipiński (1997:299); Roeleveld (2000:185); Roeleveld (N.d.)	The Natal Mercury, 1996; Roeleveld (1998:8)	Found stranded after storm. Beak morphometrics studied by Roeleveld (2000). Model based on specimen (1.85 m ML; 9.3 m EL; 7.15 m TL) built for Aquatic World gallery of South African Museum.
334	15 June 1991	South Africa (34°47′S 18°14′E) {SEA}	Undetermined	Architeuthis sp.	Entire	Entire	Female (maturing)	ML: 1400 mm; statolith; LRL: 18.1 mm; URL: 17.6 mm; additional beak measurements	SAM catalog no. S2546 [specimen SA-5 of Roeleveld (2000)]	Roeleveld (1996); Lipiński (1997:299); Roeleveld (2000:185)		Beak morphometrics studied by Roeleveld (2000).
335	?, 1992	Playa de Xagó, Asturias, Spain {NEA}	Not specified; found floating at surface?	Architeuthis dux	Mantle and head at least					Guerra et al. (2006:258)		Rest of mantle and head wrapped in a cloth of "volanta". Found by Guardia Civil.
336	1992	El Musel, Asturias, Spain {NEA}	Not specified	Architeuthis dux	Entire?			?EL: 5 m		Guerra et al. (2006:258)		
337	April 1992	playa de Los Positos, Mazo, La Palma, Canary Islands {NEA}	Found on beach	Architeuthis?	"remains"	"small samples"		"large specimen"		González & Heylen (2002:71)		Samples taken by biologists and analysed without reaching definitive conclusion.
338	7 May 1992	Kommetjie (Cape Peninsula), South Africa {SEA}	Undetermined	Architeuthis sp.	Head only	Head	Female	ML: 1600 mm [estimate]; statolith; LRL: 17.1 mm; URL: 17.3 mm; additional beak measurements	SAM catalog no. S2556 [specimen SA-6 of Roeleveld (2000)]	Roeleveld (1996); Lipiński (1997:299); Roeleveld (2000:185)		Beak morphometrics studied by Roeleveld (2000).
339	10 June 1992	west of Cape Columbine (32°53'S), South Africa {SEA}	Undetermined	Architeuthis sp.	Entire	Entire	Female (?maturing–mature)	ML: 1770 mm; statolith; LRL: 17.5 mm; URL: 18.8 mm; additional beak measurements	SAM catalog no. S2562 [specimen SA-7 of Roeleveld (2000)]	Roeleveld (1996); Lipiński (1997:299); Roeleveld (2000:185)		Beak morphometrics studied by Roeleveld (2000).
340	15–16 July 1992	northwest of Chatham Islands; see map {SWP}	Unspecified record	Architeuthis sp.	Larva(e)			Larva(e)		O'Shea (N.d.)		
341 (📷)	16 July 1992 (also reported as 20 July 1991)	Stinking Bay, near Eaglehawk Neck, Tasmania, Australia (43.13°S 147.87°E) {SWP}	Found washed ashore	Architeuthis dux	Entire	Entire	Unknown	None given	NMV catalog no. MV F74346 (main specimen); TMAG catalog nos. E20643 (gladius) & E20644 (sucker rings)	[TMAG] (2007:18); [MV] (2013)	Trivedi (2002); [Anon.] (2007a)	Found on beach; collected by S. Wisby. Main specimen at Museums Victoria preserved in 70% ethanol and 4% formalin buffered with borax. Missing tentacles according to one source.
[7] (📷)	Unknown (reported 1993)	southern Japan {NWP}	Sick/dying animal photographed and filmed in shallow water	Architeuthis dux; Moroteuthis robusta (now known as Onykia robusta)	Entire; alive	None			None	Poppe & Goto (1993:pl. 28 fig. 1); Ellis (1998a:210)	Japanese made-for-television film; Norman (2000:174)	Non-architeuthid. Photograph of sick/dying Onykia robusta taken by H. Kubota in shallow water. Squid is shown with diver, although wide-angle photography exaggerates animal's size. A video of the same squid appears in a Japanese made-for-television film. If correctly identified as an architeuthid these would have been the first photo and video of a live giant squid.
342	14 May 1993	Morne Brabant, Mauritius {SIO}	Found washed ashore	Architeuthis sp.	Entire	Undetermined		?ML: 4.5 m; WT: 240 kg		Staub (1993:141, pl. 1a,b)	Paxton (2016a:83)	Discussing maximum mantle length in giant squid, Paxton (2016a:83) wrote: "A 4.5 m specimen from Mauritius is often mistakenly cited but consultation of the primary paper (Staub, 1993) reveals an ill-defined length which is clearly not ML."
343	23 December 1993	at edge of mangroves, east side of Hungry Bay, Paget, Bermuda {NWA}	Found floating at surface	Architeuthis dux	Entire?			ML: 7–8 ft (2.1–2.4 m)	[specimen No. 13 of Roper et al. (2015)]	Roper et al. (2015:80)		Collected by Thad Martin; T. Murdoch and C. Bosch-de-Noya also mentioned. Not found in BAMZ collection.
344	February 1994	La Palma, Canary Islands {NEA}	Found on beach?	Architeuthis?	"remains"	"small samples"		None given		González & Heylen (2002:71)		Samples taken by biologists and analysed without reaching definitive conclusion.
345 (📷)	March 1994 [or 9 November]	3 miles (4.8 km) off Los Cristianos, southern Tenerife, Canary Islands {NEA}	Found floating at surface, half-dead	Architeuthis dux	Entire	Entire	Female (adult)	EL: >10 m; WT: 175/350/600 kg	Museo de la Naturaleza y Arqueología, Santa Cruz de Tenerife	González & Heylen (2002:69, fig.); [OAMC] (2008); [Anon.] (2014a); [MNH] (2014)	Nesis (2001); Miske (2002); [Anon.] (2004); Alcalá (2004)	Found by tourist boat Batros I. Thought to have been attacked by sperm whale 2–3 days earlier; several cetacean teeth found among remains. Replica exhibited in Museo de la Naturaleza y Arqueología (formerly Museo de la Naturaleza y el Hombre) in Santa Cruz de Tenerife (see video); specimen itself was long stored frozen and briefly put on public display as part of temporary exhibition "El Museo Fabulado" between 18 March and 31 May 2011.
346	21 April 1994	Izu-Ogasawara Islands, off central Honshū, Japan (35°20.1′N 143°00.1′E) from surface to 140 m depth {NWP}	By trawl (obliquely-towed plankton net)	Architeuthis sp.	Entire; "not in good condition"	Entire	(juvenile)	ML: 19.8 mm; FL: 4.5 mm; HL: 6.4 mm, additional measurements	Not stated	Tsuchiya & Mori (1998:225)	Roper & Shea (2013:116)	
347	May 1994	New Zealand (43°55′S 176°50′E) at 515 m depth {SWP}	By trawl	Architeuthis sp.	Entire	In pieces		ML: 1850 mm; FL: 760 mm	NMNZ; NMNZ M18019	Förch (1998:109)	O'Shea (2007)	Caught by F/V Dalmor.
348	May 1994	New Zealand (43°48′S 177°35′E) at 514 m depth {SWP}	By trawl	Architeuthis sp.	Entire	Incomplete		ML: 1110 mm; FL: 490 mm	NMNZ; NMNZ M18020	Förch (1998:109)	O'Shea (2007)	Caught by F/V Dalmor.
349 (📷)	August 1994	off Ishikawa-shi (now part of Uruma-shi), Okinawa Prefecture, Japan {NWP}	Not stated	giant squid ("ダイオウイカ")	Entire; tentacles intact	Entire		EL: 6.37 m; WT: 63 kg	Okinawa Churaumi Aquarium	Shimada et al. (2017:9)		On public display. Exhibited at Okinawa Churaumi Aquarium, preserved in formalin.
350	January 1995	off King Island, Bass Strait {SWP}	By trawl	Architeuthis				"slightly larger" than specimen of 9 March 1995		Zeidler & Gowlett-Holmes (1996:85)		
351	January 1995	500 km off South Island, New Zealand {SWP}	By trawl	Architeuthis				"even larger" than January 1995 specimen from King Island		Zeidler & Gowlett-Holmes (1996:85)		
352	9 March 1995	~3.2 nautical miles (5.9 km) SSE of Cape Banks, Australia (37°56.32′S 140°20.79′E) {SWP}	Found floating at surface, recently dead	Architeuthis sp.	Entire, tail damaged, all arms damaged (with most tips missing), tentacles damaged (left missing club, right with detached club portion), eyes missing, head detached	Entire	Female	ML: 1530 mm; VML: 1400 mm; MW: 440 mm; MT: 40 mm [maximum]; HL: 320 mm; HW: 270 mm; WT: 48 kg (mantle) + 38 kg (head with limbs); more FL: 430 mm; FW: 175 mm; FuL: 250 mm; FuD: 110 mm; FuCL: 190 mm; FuCW: 50 mm [maximum]; GL: 1440 mm; GW: 190 mm [maximum]; RL: 340 mm; RW: 130 mm [maximum]; EyOD: 170 mm; distance between eye orbits (dorsally): 90 mm; RL: 70 mm [curled]; RW: 10 mm [between teeth, maximum]; AL(I): 810/610 mm; AL(II): 1450/1120 mm; AL(III): 1330/1290 mm; AL(IV): 1140/1750 mm; ASD: 7–14 mm [left arm I]; TL: 4260/2970 mm (7390 mm total incl. detached club portion); DC: 195 mm; MaL: 410 mm; CaL: 130 mm; CW: 50 mm [maximum]; CSD: 25 mm [maximum]; LRL: 18 mm; URL: 18 mm; additional beak measurements	SAMA; SAMA D18936 (main specimen) + B80 (frozen sample) + XD0040 (alcohol-fixed sample)	Zeidler & Gowlett-Holmes (1996:85)	Ellis (1998a:6)	Caught by Martin Von Stanke on F/V Ocean Lady over ~25 m bottom depth. Stored on ice and transported to museum (with assistance of Thierry Laperousaz) after 1 day without prior freezing. Tissue samples from digestive gland and arm (SAMA B80) saved at −80 °C, muscle samples from mantle and tentacle (SAMA XD0040) preserved in 100% alcohol. more Beak, radula and fragmented gladius removed and preserved separately. Stomach contained only 9 undetermined squid suckers (13–16 mm diameter) and remains of others. Two large gashes (~20 cm) on left side of mantle may indicate predator attack (but no whales sighted in area at the time).
353	2 April 1995	Golfo San Jorge, Argentina (46°30′S 66°00′W) at 70 m depth {SWA}	By trawl	Architeuthis			Female (mature)	ML: 1625 mm	Museo Argentino de Ciencias Naturales "Bernardino Rivadavia", Buenos Aires	Brunetti et al. (1998:xxx)	Ré et al. (1998:109); [Anon.] (1999a); Brunetti et al. (1999:16); [Anon.] (2016)	Originally displayed in the hall of marine giants (sala de gigantes del mar) at Museo Argentino de Ciencias Naturales "Bernardino Rivadavia" in Buenos Aires from 1996, but removed in 2005 due to "technical issues" affecting it. Considered the museum's iconic specimen, it was placed back on display in July 2016 (see video) as part of celebrations of the museum's 204th anniversary (see video).
354 (📷)	26 April 1995	west of Aran Islands, County Galway, Ireland (53°00′N 12°20′W) at 287 m depth {NEA}	By 80 mm mesh benthic trawl	Architeuthis sp.; Architeuthis dux	Entire	Head, tentacles, heart, and gills	Male (mature)	ML: 1028 mm; MW: 379 mm; TL: 4555 mm; EL: 5970 mm; WT: 26.9 kg; more HL: 275 mm; HW: 135 mm; AL(I): 870 mm; AL(II): not measured; AL(III): 1054 mm; AL(IV): 1512/1465 mm; LAL: 1512 mm; TCL: 504 mm; DC: 158 mm; MaL: 252 mm; CaL: 94 mm; HeL: no obs.; FL: 390 mm; FW: 298 mm (one fin: 149 mm); EyD: 80 mm; PL: 555 mm; SoA: no obs.; SL: 125–150 mm; LRL: 10.9 mm; URL: 12.5 mm; SInc: 294; G(W): 4.25%	NMI catalog no. 1995.14	McSweeney (1995); Collins et al. (1997:562); Guerra et al. (2004:8); Nunn & Holmes (2008)	Lordan et al. (1998:905); Collins (1998a:489); O'Sullivan (2017)	Taken by trawler M.F.V. Sionnainn, skippered by Michael Flannery (Flannery's son caught two giant squid in the same area in 2017: #651 and 652). University College Cork scientist Colm Lordan interviewed about find on RTÉ News on 1 May 1995; examination began same day. Donated to National Museum of Ireland – Natural History by Lordan; preserved in spirit.
355	24 June 1995	Porcupine Bank, Ireland (52°25′N 13°45′W) at 300 m depth {NEA}	By 80 mm mesh benthic trawl	Architeuthis sp.; Architeuthis dux	Entire	Undeterminded	Male (mature)	ML: 975 mm; MW: 335 mm; EL: 5950 mm; WT: 22.45 kg; more HL: 270 mm; HW: 137 mm; TL: 4823 mm; TCL: 500 mm; DC: 172 mm; MaL: 252/236 mm; CaL: 77/92 mm; FL: 356 mm; FW: 266 mm; EyD: 95 mm; PL: 574 mm; SoA: no obs.; SL: 120–140 mm; HeL: no obs.; LRL: 12.7 mm; URL: 12 mm; SInc: 375; G(W): 3.29%	NMI catalog no. 1995.44	Collins et al. (1997:562); Guerra et al. (2004:8); Nunn & Holmes (2008)	Lordan et al. (1998:905); Collins (1998a:489); O'Sullivan (2017)	Taken by trawler M.F.V. Sionnainn, skippered by Michael Flannery (Flannery's son caught two giant squid in the same area in 2017: #651 and 652). Donated to National Museum of Ireland – Natural History by Colm Lordan; preserved in spirit.
356	25 June 1995	southwest of Aran Islands, County Galway, Ireland (52°50′N 10°20′W) at 110 m depth {NEA}	By 80 mm mesh benthic trawl	Architeuthis sp.; Architeuthis clarkei; Architeuthis dux	Entire	Head and mantle	Male (mature)	ML: 1084 mm; MW: 335 mm; WT: 26.5 kg; more HL: 288 mm; HW: 144 mm; AL(IV): 1111 mm; LAL: 1111 mm; FL: 368 mm; FW: 264 mm; EyD: 96 mm; HeL: no obs.; PL: 702 mm; SoA: no obs.; SL: 135–155 mm; LRL: 13.3 mm; URL: 10 mm; SInc: 422; G(W): 2.96%	NMI catalog no. 1995.43	Collins et al. (1997:562); Guerra et al. (2004:8); Nunn & Holmes (2008)	Lordan et al. (1998:905); Collins (1998a:489)	Taken by trawler Galway. Donated to National Museum of Ireland – Natural History by Colm Lordan; preserved in spirit.
357	26 June 1995	off Fowey Rocks Light, Florida, United States (Straits of Florida) (24°45′N 81°00′W; given as "24°45'N 81°W") {NWA}	Found floating at surface	Architeuthis dux	Entire?, "mutilated remains"			EL: 15–18 ft (4.6–5.5 m); WT: 60 lb (27 kg)	[specimen No. 14 of Roper et al. (2015)]	Roper et al. (2015:80)		Identified based on photo.
	7 July 1995	south Tenerife, Canary Islands {NEA}	Recovered by fishermen, dead	Architeuthis dux	Entire?, "partially damaged"; possibly with incomplete limbs and missing posterior end of mantle	Beak (at least)	Female	DML: 1520 mm [DML estimated from LRL: 1418/1493 mm]; EL: 7.6 m [estimated from DML estimate]; LRL: 16.0 mm; URL: 15.0 mm; additional beak measurements	[specimen ID1 of Perales-Raya et al. (2020)]	Perales-Raya et al. (2020:359, 361, 365)		Beak increments used by Perales-Raya et al. (2020) to estimate age at 615 days. Beak preserved in 70% ethanol upon collection; rehydrated in distilled water for several days prior to age estimation.
358	10 July 1995	South Africa (32°50′S 16°40′E) {SEA}	Undetermined	Architeuthis sp.	Entire	Entire	Male (mature)	ML: 1180 mm; statolith; LRL: 14.1 mm; URL: 15.4 mm; additional beak measurements	SAM catalog no. S3353 [specimen SA-10 of Roeleveld (2000)]	Lipiński (1997:299); Roeleveld (2000:185)		Beak morphometrics studied by Roeleveld (2000).
359	15 July 1995	Golfo San Jorge, Bahía Bustamante, Argentina (45°12′S 66°30′W) {SWA}	Found washed ashore on mat of seaweed				Female (immature)	ML: 1300 mm		Ruiz & Fondacaro (1996)	Ré et al. (1998:109); Brunetti et al. (1999:16)	
360	27 September 1995	Playa de los Pozos, Asturias, Spain {NEA}	By seine fishing	Architeuthis dux	Entire?			WT: 160 kg		Guerra et al. (2006:258)		Caught by the boats Nuevo Juanito and Hermanos of Avilés using a seine.
361	1 December 1995	off South Island, New Zealand (43°24'–43°31'S 169°20'–169°10'E) at 305 m depth {SWP}	By trawl	Architeuthis sp.	Entire	Entire			NIWA	Puente (1996); O'Shea (2007)		Collected by T. Devlin on F/V J. Elaine. O'Shea (2007) gives coordinates as 43°24.31′S 169°20.10′E.
362	December 1995	off New Zealand (43°26′S 176°23′E) {SWP}		Architeuthis	Entire?	Entire?, left tentacle loose	Male (mature)	ML: 1200 mm; TL: 2757+ mm [left]; CL: 552 mm [left]; CSC: 247 [left]; TSC: 278 [left]; additional indices and counts	NMNZ; NMNZ Z.8900 [specimen NZ-36 of Roeleveld (2002)]	Roeleveld (2002:727)		Tentacle morphology examined by Roeleveld (2002).
363	31 December 1995	off South Island, New Zealand (43°12.3′S 178°19.9′W) at 425 m depth {SWP}	By trawl	Architeuthis sp.	Entire	Entire, both tentacles loose	Female (maturing?)	ML: 2000 mm; WT: ~600 lb (270 kg); TL: 7300 mm [later 5702/4813 mm]; CL: 850 mm [later 812/753 mm]; CSC: 243/242; TSC: 273/268; additional indices and counts	NMNZ; NMNZ Z.8436 [specimen NZ-16 of Roeleveld (2002)]	Ellis (1997:1); Förch (1998:specimen 16); Roeleveld (2002:727, figs. 2–3)	Puente (1996); [Anon.] (1996a); O'Shea (2007)	Collected by FRV Tangaroa. Originally deposited at NIWA. Tentacle morphology examined by Roeleveld (2002).
364	31 December 1995	off New Zealand (43°12′S 178°20′W) at 425 m depth {SWP}		Architeuthis						O'Shea (2007)		Listed as separate record by O'Shea (2007).
365	Unknown (reported 1996)	near Mt Gambier, off Cape Banks, South Australia {SWP}	Found floating at surface	Architeuthis sp.	Entire	Entire	Female	WT: 86 kg; BL+HL: 1.85 m; AL: 1.75 m (longest); TL: 7.39 m (longest); EyOD: 17 cm; EL: >9 m	SAMA	Zeidler (1996:7, fig.)		Female with fully formed ovaries and small white eggs.
366	"very early" January 1996 [or 16 January]	off South Island, New Zealand (43°26.47′S 176°23.17′E) at 310 m depth {SWP}	By trawl	Architeuthis sp.	Entire	Entire	Male	TL: 21 ft (6.4 m)	NIWA	Ellis (1997:9)	Förch (1998:109); Puente (1996); [Anon.] (1996a); O'Shea (2007)	Caught by FRV Tangaroa.
367	February 1996	off New Zealand (43°26′S 176°23′E) at 310 m depth {SWP}		Architeuthis						O'Shea (2007)		
368	February 1996	Perlora, Asturias, Spain {NEA}	Not specified	Architeuthis dux	Mantle severed in its first third, missing arms and tentacles					Guerra et al. (2006:258)		
369 (📷)	14 March 1996 (also reported as 25 March)	Cape Sorell, off Strahan, west coast of Tasmania, Australia (42°15′S 144°41′E–42°00′S 144°35′E) at 840–1000 m depth {SWP}	Captured live by commercial trawl fishing for orange roughy (Hoplostethus atlanticus), but likely died under weight of fish during haul to surface	Architeuthis sanctipauli Velain, 1877	Entire; missing majority of skin	Entire	Female (subadult)	ML: 191 cm; EL: 12 m [estimate]	NMV catalog no. MV F74479; TMAG catalog no. E23143	Norman & Lu (1997:683, fig. 1a); Norman (2000:152, fig.); Landman et al. (2004:685); [TMAG] (2007:18)	Ellis (1998a:6)	Isotopic analysis of statolith carried out by Landman et al. (2004) to determine age and habitat. Photographed by David Paul.
370	21 March 1996	off New Zealand (50°50′S 166°55′E) at 420 m depth {SWP}		Architeuthis						O'Shea (2007)		
371 (📷)	22 March 1996	between Macquarie Harbour and Port Davey, off west coast of Tasmania, Australia (42°54′S 145°0′E) at 458/460 m depth {SWP}	Captured live in commercial fishing trawl	Architeuthis sanctipauli Velain, 1877	Entire, skin largely intact	Entire	Female (submature)	ML: 2.4 m; EL: 15 m [intact estimate]; WT: 220 kg; ovary: ~3 kg ("small")	NMV catalog no. MV F74482	Norman & Lu (1997:683, fig. 1b–d); Norman (2000:154, 4 figs.); Landman et al. (2004:685); [TMAG] (2007:18)	Ellis (1998a:6); Packham (1998); [Anon.] (2003, fig.); Roper & Shea (2013:114, 116); Perales-Raya et al. (2020:357, 369–370)	Mated female with spermatophores embedded in epidermis of both ventral arms, around 1 m from mouth. Ovary occupying <20% of mantle cavity contained "hundreds of thousands of undeveloped eggs". Adult specimen according to Landman et al. (2004:686). Isotopic analysis of statolith carried out by Landman et al. (2004) to determine age and habitat. Photographed by David Paul. Featured in episode of 1998 documentary series The X Creatures. Based on mantle length described as "largest measured specimen" by Perales-Raya et al. (2020), who estimated age of specimen (and maximum lifespan of species) at 2.5–5.1 (mean 3.3) years or 2.1–3.5 (mean 2.6) years, depending on growth rate estimate. Also cited by Roper & Shea (2013:114) as specimen with one of greatest recorded mantle lengths.
372 (📷)	24 May 1996	Golfo San Jorge, Bahía Bustamante, Argentina (45°08′S 66°31′W) {SWA}	Found washed ashore, dead	Architeuthis sp.		Entire	Female (immature)	ML: 1940 mm; ?TL: 4.2 m; WT: 180 kg; see Ré et al. (1998)	MCNOPM	Ré et al. (1996:161, fig. 1); Ré et al. (1998:109)	Brunetti et al. (1999:16, fig. 7A)	Exhibited at the museum of Puerto Madryn. Photographed with two children.
373	10 June 1996	off King Island, Tasmania, Australia, at 1000 m depth {SWP}	By trawl	Architeuthis sp.	Entire	Entire		WT: >200 kg; ?TL: 8 m	NMV	Gannon (1996); [Anon.] (1996b)	Ellis (1998a:6)	Captured by D. McNamara and R. Bradshaw on trawler Empress Pearl.
374	1 October 1996 (also reported as 10 January)	off King Island, northwest of Tasmania, Australia (40°S 143°9′E–40°15′S 143°15′E) at 897/980–1000 m depth {SWP}	By trawl	Architeuthis sanctipauli Velain, 1877	Entire?	Entire	Female (subadult)	ML: 159 cm (without fins)	NMV catalog no. MV F78297	Landman et al. (2004:685); [TMAG] (2007:18)	Carlini (1998); Carlini & Graves (1999:60)	Tissue sample used for COI sequence analysis by Carlini (1998) and Carlini & Graves (1999) (GenBank accession: AF000027). Isotopic analysis of statolith carried out by Landman et al. (2004) to determine age and habitat.
375	19 November 1996	off Ensenada, Baja California, Mexico {NEP}	Found in stomach contents of blue shark (Prionace glauca)	Architeuthis sp.	Pair of beaks (from a single specimen)	Entire		LRL: 13.44 mm; ML: 741.5 mm [estimate]; WT: 24365.0 g [estimate]		Markaida & Sosa-Nishizaki (2010)		Live weight constituted an estimated 7.27% of total prey weight from 893 blue sharks sampled. First giant squid record from Mexican waters and southernmost record in the California Current.
376	1996	Chatham Rise, New Zealand {SWP}		Architeuthis				?EL: 26 ft (7.9 m)		O'Shea (1997)	Ellis (1998a:264)	
377	1996	Chatham Rise, New Zealand {SWP}		Architeuthis				?EL: 13 ft (4.0 m)		O'Shea (1997)	Ellis (1998a:264)	
378	1996	New Zealand {SWP}		Architeuthis				?EL: 22–26 ft (6.7–7.9 m)		O'Shea (1997)	Ellis (1998a:264)	
379 (📷)	24 December 1996	Hawai, Tōhaku District, Tottori Prefecture, Japan {NWP}	Found washed ashore	Architeuthis japonica	Entire, tentacles missing	Entire		ML: 171 cm; WL: ~450 cm [or 14.4 ft (4.4 m)]; EL: ~10 m [estimate; or 7–8 m]; WT: 120–150 kg	National Museum of Nature and Science (Tokyo)	[NSMT] (2012)	The Japan Times, 1996; Ellis (1998a:264); [Anon.] (2005); Shimada et al. (2017:9)	On public display. Exhibited at the National Museum of Nature and Science (preserved in formalin), where it formed the backdrop for a press event with Tsunemi Kubodera on the first images of a live giant squid in the wild (#492).
380	1997	off Sergipe, Brazil {SWA}	"found"	Architeuthis						Martins & Perez (2009)		Unreported prior to Martins & Perez (2009).
381 (📷)	15 July 1997 (also reported as 16 July)	North Sea, off Scotland, at 100 m depth {NEA}	Caught in net	Architeuthis	Entire; tentacles intact	Entire		?EL: 5 m	SMNH catalog nos. 4702 ["body"] & 4703 [arm fragments]	[SMNH] (2015); [SMNH] (2026b); [SMNH] (2026c); [SMNH] (N.d.)		Caught by Danish fishermen. Purchased by Swedish Museum of Natural History for 5000 kronor (equivalent to US$1,313 in 2025) from Ica Centrum, Uppsala. Subsequently exhibited in tank at the museum, preserved in 80% ethanol. Identified as Architeuthis sp. by Anders Warén in 1997.
382	28 October 1997	10 miles (16 km) offshore, Bahamas (Straits of Florida) {NWA}	Found floating at surface	Architeuthis dux	Entire?, "completely intact body"			None given	[specimen No. 15 of Roper et al. (2015)]	Roper et al. (2015:80)		Found over bottom depth of 2000 m.
383 (📷)	16 November 1997	beach near Fuengirola, Andalusia, Spain (36°34′36″N 04°35′06″W) {MED}	Found washed ashore dead but relatively fresh	Architeuthis sp.	Entire; tentacles missing, all arms incomplete except I(R) and II(R), lower beak damaged, upper beak broken, most sucker rings lost, reddish skin largely missing	Entire	Female (almost mature)	DML: 1495 mm; MW: 600 mm [maximum]; HL: 300 mm; HW: 380 mm; FL: 540 mm [including 'tail']; FW: 440 mm; EyD: 160/160 mm; AL(I): 76/118 mm; AL(II): 81/139 mm; AL(III): 103/126 mm; AL(IV): 123/130 mm; GiL: 242/272 mm; NGL: 450/450 mm; ovary length: 544 mm; URL: 17.2 mm; WT: 104 kg; additional beak measurements	Museo Alborania, Aula del Mar de CREMA, Málaga, Spain	González et al. (2000:745, fig. 1); [Anon.] (2000b:25)	Guerra et al. (2006:89); see museum guide	On public display. First known giant squid specimen from the Mediterranean Sea. Frozen after discovery; later thawed and preserved in formaldehyde. Nidamental glands and ovary (occupying 36% of mantle cavity) very well developed, latter containing hundreds of thousands of still-opaque eggs; stomach empty. Guerra et al. (2006:89) give mid-1998 as date and ~125 cm as mantle length.
384	December 1997 – April 1998	Chatham Rise, New Zealand {SWP}	"Captured"	Architeuthis	Seven specimens		5 males (mature), 2 females (mature)			Landman et al. (1999:72)		
385 (📷)	27 December 1997	Merneo [Mernoo] Bank, Chatham Rise, New Zealand (44°20.4–23.5'S 173°54.3–37.0'E) at 671–674 m depth {SWP}	By trawl	Architeuthis kirki Robson, 1887	Entire; tentacles broken off, minor damage to fins and one arm	Entire	Male (mature)	ML: 1.24 m; ?WL: 25.25 ft (7.70 m) ["without ten[t]acles"]; WT: ~200 lb (91 kg) [220 kg per specimen label]; EyD: 6 in (15 cm); beak crest length: 47.5 mm	AMNH catalog no. 291938 (main specimen; buccal mass and beak stored separately)	[AMNH] (1998a); [AMNH] (1998b); Landman & Ellis (1998:150, fig.); Cordeiro & Hussaini (1999:25); Landman et al. (1999:72); Dussling & Johnson (1999); [AMNH] (1999); Pollak (1999); [AMNH] (2013); Landman (2015)	Tanabe (2012:12, fig. 3 subfigs. 2a–b); Tanabe et al. (2015:35)	Collected by commercial fishermen of F/V Aquila. Offered as gift to AMNH by Steve O'Shea of NIWA, who contacted Neil Landman in March 1998. Transported from Wellington to New York City by combination of refrigerated trucks and air cargo (with unscheduled delay in Los Angeles). Received by AMNH still frozen on 10 June 1998, as first specimen in its history. Photographed by Portia Rollings of AMNH upon arrival. Examined and preserved by Landman and Paula Mikkelsen. more Tissue samples taken and beak and radula removed and placed in 95% ethanol. Specimen injected with and fixed in 10% saline formalin solution. Kept this way for 2 weeks and buffered in first 4 days (ultimately with sodium bicarbonate) to preserve sucker rings. Next subjected to 5 days of freshwater washes and finally transferred to 70/75% ethanol. Mature spermatophore found in mantle cavity. Put on display in Hall of Biodiversity from 12 October 1999, in 1500-litre stainless steel and fibreglass tank (built under direction of David Harvey) with tentacles taken from #390. Covered in 1999 children's book Giant Squid: Mystery of the Deep.
386 (📷)	18 January 1998	Newburgh beach, Aberdeenshire, Scotland {NEA}	Found washed ashore	Architeuthis sp.	Entire, "good condition"	Entire	Female (immature)	ML: 1230 mm; EL: 4.6 m; WT: 40 kg; see Collins (1998a:491)	NMSZ	Collins (1998a:491); Collins (1998b, 6 figs.)	Collins (1998c); Boyle & Rodhouse (2005:196, fig. 12.1.1)	Found on snow-covered beach by M.Sc. student Oscar Campbell who collected tentacular club; identified as Architeuthis at University of Aberdeen. Measured in situ following day by Martin Collins's group and dragged in two pieces (mantle, head plus limbs) to Zoology Department, where measured and dissected; stomach empty. Beak and buccal mass removed and put on display at Zoology Department.
387	13 March 1998	off New Zealand (42°50.9–49.8'S 177°16.6'–176°55.3'E) at 489–475 m depth {SWP}		Architeuthis						O'Shea (2007)		
388	9 April 1998	South Patagonian shelf, off Argentina (50°39.0′S 66°35.3′W) at 105 m depth (bottom depth also 105 m) {SWA}	By bottom trawl	Architeuthis sp.			Female	ML: 1.4 m	Instituto Nacional de Investigación y Desarrollo Pesquero (INIDEP)	Brunetti et al. (2002)	[Anon.] (1999a); Brunetti et al. (1999:16)	Taken by the vessel Kasuga Maru of the Pespasa fishing company. Collected by fishery inspector. Surface water temperature recorded as 9.1 °C and air temperature as 14 °C.
389	9 April 1998	off New Zealand (44°00′S 177°35′W) at 500 m depth {SWP}		Architeuthis						O'Shea (2007)		
390	10 April 1998	off New Zealand (43°56.8'–44°03.8'S 175°51.6–30.1'E) at 519–523 m depth {SWP}	By trawl	Architeuthis kirki Robson, 1887					AMNH (two tentacles and one complete arm)	O'Shea (2007); Landman (2015)		Collected by commercial fishermen of F/V Aquila. Displayed at American Museum of Natural History with body of #385.
391	18 April 1998	about ten miles (16 km) from Saint Paul, La Réunion Island (21°00′S 55°45′E) {SIO}	Found floating at surface	Architeuthis dux	"big chunk of flesh ... including the base of the arms, head and the upper part of the mantle"	Buccal mass, beak; tip of rostrum of lower beak broken		LRL: 17.0–17.5 mm [estimate]; ML: 174–193 cm [estimate]		Cherel (2003:1295)		Fishermen reported rapid skin colour change, suggesting chromatophores were still active and specimen was freshly dead. Other remains of large squid were observed. Sperm whales said to have occurred in the area at the time.
392	28 July 1998	off New Zealand (42°32.2′S 170°24.1′E) at 500–575 m depth {SWP}		Architeuthis						O'Shea (2007)		
393	29 July 1998	off New Zealand (41°59'–42°10'S 170°32–33'E) at 405 m depth {SWP}		Architeuthis						O'Shea (2007)		
394	31 July 1998	off New Zealand (41°05′S 170°50′E) at 452–526 m depth {SWP}		Architeuthis						O'Shea (2007)		
395	20 August 1998	off New Zealand (42°00′S 170°30′E) {SWP}		Architeuthis						O'Shea (2007)		
396	13 November 1998	Kerguelen waters in southern Polar Frontal Zone (47°14′S 69°23′E) at 630–710 m depth {SIO}	Found in stomach contents of sleeper shark (Somniosus sp.)	Architeuthis dux	Lower and upper beak	Entire		LRL: 15.51 mm; ML: 128 cm [estimate]		Cherel (2003:1296); Cherel & Duhamel (2004:25)	Rincon (2004)	Mantle length estimated using allometric equation from Roeleveld (2000).
397	19 December 1998	off New Zealand (43°18.5–32.6'S 174°10.5–17.7'E) at 567 m depth {SWP}		Architeuthis						O'Shea (2007)		
398	between 26 December 1998 and 9 February 1999	off New Zealand (44°11.2′S 178°15.7′W) at 500 m depth {SWP}		Architeuthis						O'Shea (2007)		
[8]	1999 (reported)	New Zealand {SWP}		Architeuthis; Asperoteuthis lui Salcedo-Vargas, 1999						Salcedo-Vargas (1999)		Non-architeuthid.
399	7 January 1999	off New Zealand (43°51.34'S 173°20'–174°37'E) {SWP}		Architeuthis						O'Shea (2007)		
400	22 January 1999	off New Zealand (43°33′S 174°18′E) {SWP}		Architeuthis						O'Shea (2007)		
401	22 January 1999	off New Zealand (44°08.2'–43°58.5'S 175°20.3'–174°45.5'E) {SWP}		Architeuthis						O'Shea (2007)		
402	27 January 1999	off New Zealand (44°20.5′S 177°08.8′W) at 504 m depth {SWP}		Architeuthis						O'Shea (2007)		
403	12 February 1999	off New Zealand (44°16.0′S 179°16.7′W) at 545 m depth {SWP}		Architeuthis						O'Shea (2007)		
404	15 February 1999	South Patagonian shelf, <30 miles (48 km) off Isla de los Estados, Argentina (53°54.6′S 63°45.9′W) at 316–360 m depth (bottom depth 450 m) {SWA}	By midwater trawl	Architeuthis sp.	Entire	Entire	Female	ML: 1.7 m; ?WL: >3 m; WT: 150 kg	Instituto Nacional de Investigación y Desarrollo Pesquero (INIDEP)	[Anon.] (1999a); Brunetti et al. (2002)	Brunetti et al. (1999:16)	Taken by the vessel Rikuzen of the Pesantar SA fishing company in 105 m long drag net. Collected by scientific observer. Frozen onboard with arms reconstructed after being crushed by weight of fish catch. Landed in Ushuaia on 18 March 1999 and thawed on 22 March for sample collection. Examined by Silvana Pineda and others from Instituto Nacional de Investigación y Desarrollo Pesquero (INIDEP), who travelled especially from Mar del Plata.
405	16 February 1999	Kerguelen waters in southern Polar Frontal Zone (48°11′S 71°15′E) at 550–870 m depth {SIO}	Found in stomach contents of sleeper shark (Somniosus sp.)	Architeuthis dux	Lower and upper beak	Entire		LRL: 16.33 mm; ML: 152 cm [estimate]		Cherel (2003:1296); Cherel & Duhamel (2004:25)	Rincon (2004)	Mantle length estimated using allometric equation from Roeleveld (2000).
406	9 March 1999	off New Zealand (48°50.2′S 167°12.3′E) {SWP}		Architeuthis						O'Shea (2007)		
407 (📷)	15 March 1999	off New Zealand (48º36.1–54.2'S 166º15.2–24.4'E) at 798 m depth {SWP}	By trawl	Architeuthis	Entire; tentacles intact	Entire		EL: 27 ft (8.2 m)	Mote Aquarium, Mote Marine Laboratory	O'Shea (2007); [Mote] (2015); Ginsberg (2018)	Gorn & Marcil (2003); [Anon.] (2007b)	On public display. Nicknamed "Molly the Mollusk". Transferred to Mote Marine Laboratory in 1999 and exhibited at Mote Aquarium since 2001. Spent two years as part of travelling exhibit "Sea Monsters" before returning to Mote in September 2015; displayed at "Exploration Gallery" (formerly "Shark Attack Theater"). Featured in 2003 episode of documentary series Mystery Hunters.
408	16 March 1999	off New Zealand (48º49.55'S 166º53'–167º16'E) {SWP}		Architeuthis						O'Shea (2007)		
409	5 April 1999	Goulding Cay, Northeast Providence Channel, Bahamas (25°01′38.7″N 77°34′27.3″W; given as "25°1'387"N 77°34'273"W") {NWA}	Found floating at surface	Architeuthis sp.; Architeuthis dux	Entire, "whole specimen"; distal half of tentacles missing	Entire, in two pieces	Male (mature)	EL: 11 ft (3.4 m) [missing tentacle ends]	RSMAS; "Ex UMML 31.3125" [specimen No. 16 of Roper et al. (2015)]	[Anon.] (1999b:1); Roper et al. (2015:80)		Found over bottom depth of 2300 m.
410	14 May 1999	off New Zealand (43°28.35′S 174°14′E) at 515 m depth {SWP}		Architeuthis						O'Shea (2007)		
411	3 June 1999	6 miles (9.7 km) east of Fowey Rocks Light, Florida, United States (Straits of Florida) (25°35′N 80°07′W) {NWA}	Found floating at surface, dead	Architeuthis sp.; Architeuthis dux	Entire in "fresh" condition but heavily mutilated; missing distal third of mantle (incl. fins), tentacles, and ends of all arms but arm I(R)	Entire		ML: 700 mm; ML: 1000 mm [intact estimate]; WT: ~20 kg [intact estimate]; Roper et al. (2015:80) give unspecified measurement (total length of remains?) of "110 cm 3.6 ft"	RSMAS catalog no. UMML 31.312b / 31.3126 [specimen No. 17 of Roper et al. (2015)]	Seibel et al. (2000:286); Roper et al. (2015:80)		Collected by charter-boat Top Dog (Capt. Phil Slaga and Mate Bo Spieler). Found over bottom depth of >300 m. Taken to the University of Miami's Rosenstiel School of Marine, Atmospheric, and Earth Science, where kept on ice or in refrigerated cold room for approximately three days prior to dissection. Wet weight estimated using mass–length relationship of O'Dor (1988) for ommastrephid squids. Mantle tissue used in study of enzymatic activity by Seibel et al. (2000), providing first estimates of giant squid metabolism and locomotory ability.
412	14 June 1999	off west coast of Tasmania, Australia, at 500–700 m depth {SWP}	Caught by trawler fishing for blue grenadier	Architeuthis sp.	Entire?	Entire; later discarded (Note: Damaged by repeated freezing and thawing for public display. Main specimen eventually discarded but some remains may have been retained.)	Male	WT: 190 kg	TMAG catalog no. E23413	Deagle et al. (2005:417); Deagle (2006:27); [TMAG] (2007:18)		Specimen was kept frozen in storage until dissection in September 2002. Gut contents underwent genetic screening for prey.
413	1 July 1999	off west coast of Tasmania, Australia {SWP}	By trawl	Architeuthis sp.	Entire?	Discarded		WT: 245 kg	TMAG catalog no. E23414	[TMAG] (2007:19)		Head and limbs separated from mantle.
414	13 July 1999	off New Zealand (41°03.1′S 170°42.4′E) at 530 m depth {SWP}		Architeuthis						O'Shea (2007)		
415	15 July 1999	off New Zealand (42°33′S 170°31′E) at 460 m depth {SWP}		Architeuthis						O'Shea (2007)		
416	17 July 1999	off New Zealand (42°31.32′S 170°21.09′E) at 535 m depth {SWP}		Architeuthis						O'Shea (2007)		Temperature (BT) recorded as 11.5 °C.
417	21 July 1999	off New Zealand (42°27.32′S 170°28.10′E) at 442 m depth {SWP}		Architeuthis						O'Shea (2007)		
418	5 August 1999	off New Zealand (41°56′S 170°26′E) at 500 m depth {SWP}		Architeuthis						O'Shea (2007)		
419	29 August 1999	nearly 175 miles (282 km) off Santa Catarina, Brazil (28°05′S 45°35′W) over 2,400 m deep waters {SWA}	Found floating at surface	Architeuthis	Entire; arm pairs I, II, III half-missing, arm pair IV complete, tentacles missing, reproductive system virtually missing	Entire	Female (mature)	ML: 1160 mm; WT: 50 kg; WL: 2480 mm; MW: 460 mm; HL: 270 mm; HW: 360 mm; FL: 460 mm; FW: 380 mm; FuL: 450 mm [ventral]; FuCL: 125 mm; FuCW: 61 mm; AL(I): 520/510 mm; AL(II): 620/560 mm; AL(III): 750/550 mm; AL(IV): 960/800 mm; ASD: 18 mm [maximum]; GiL: 280 mm; LRL: 15 mm; URL: 20 mm; ED: ~2.0 mm; other measurements	Museu Nacional-RJ (MNRJ 10761)	Martins & Perez (2009, figs. 1–14)		Spotted by crew of Brazilian long-liner Macedo V. Spermatophores embedded in left ventral arm, around 60 cm from mouth. Small number of eggs present (~2.0 mm wide). Authors found "a few peculiarities [...] [i]n the shape of the fins, head and the cross-section and length of ventral arms".
420	1 November 1999	off Maria Island, Tasmania, Australia {SWP}	By trawl	Architeuthis sp.	Entire?	Discarded	Female	WT: 255 kg	TMAG catalog no. E23415	[TMAG] (2007:19)		Female with spermatophores. Wrapped in orange fishing line on retrieval. Eye lens and "back" separated from specimen.
421	November 1999	Carrandi, Asturias, Spain {NEA}	By trawl	Architeuthis dux				WT: 107 kg [dead]		Guerra et al. (2006:258)		Collected by the trawler Minchos VI.
422	23 November 1999	Bloody Bay Wall, Cayman Islands (Caribbean Sea) (19°44′N 79°48′W) {NWA}	Not stated	Architeuthis dux	Not stated			None given	[specimen No. 18 of Roper et al. (2015)]	Roper et al. (2015:81)		
423 (📷)	9 December 1999	approximately 34 miles (55 km) from Gijón, off coast of Asturias, Spain (43°52.54′N 05°18.74′W) at 270–550 or 300–600 m depth {NEA}	By trawl; caught alive	Architeuthis dux Steenstrup, 1857	Entire; missing tentacles and arms I, II, III; arm IV(R) not intact	Entire	Female (immature)	ML: 1800 mm; MW: 560 mm; WT: 148 kg; more VML: 1650 mm; MT: 30 mm; HW: 415 mm; AL(IV): 2160/178 mm (second not intact); LRL: 20.5 mm; URL: 21.0 mm; GL: 1670 mm; GW: 200 mm; FL: 690 mm; FW: 515 mm; EyD: 130 mm [estimate]; FuL: 260 mm; FuCL: 175 mm; FuCW: 41 mm; GiL: 500 mm; NGL: 340 mm	CEPESMA	González et al. (2002); Guerra et al. (2004:2, 4); Guerra et al. (2006:9, 258, fig. 1)	Sitges (2003)	First record of living specimen collected in Spanish Atlantic waters. Caught by Spanish pair trawlers Minchos V and Minchos VI based in Cillero, Lugo, while targeting blue whiting. more Auctioned off in Avilés fish market and acquired by Jiménez Fishmongers (Pescaderias Jiménez) of Avilés and later CEPESMA president Luis Laria, who froze it immediately after measurements were taken. Defrosted, dissected and reconstructed in courtyard of Padre Galo public school (Colegio Público Padre Galo), Luarca, on 25 January 2000, surrounded by school students, onlookers, and journalists. Placed in transparent glass case and fixed for 48 hours in 4% formalin; later preserved in 70% alcohol.
424	Unknown (between 1954 and 2000)	off New Zealand (42°35.41′S 170°15.03′E) at 400 m depth {SWP}		Architeuthis						O'Shea (2007)		Date not recorded.
425	Unknown (between 1954 and 2000)	off New Zealand (42°31.9′S 170°16.6′E) {SWP}		Architeuthis						O'Shea (2007)		MFish SOP Trip 1247/7.
426	Unknown (reported 2000)	North Atlantic (otherwise "no data") {NEA/NWA}		Architeuthis			Female (maturing)	ML: 1180 mm; TL: 4395/4320 mm; CL: 785/680 mm; CSC: 260/243; TSC: 286/272; LRL: 15.7 mm; URL: 14.9 mm; additional beak measurements, indices, and counts	VSM [specimen NA-22 of Roeleveld (2000) and Roeleveld (2002)]	Roeleveld (2000:185); Roeleveld (2002:727)		Beak morphometrics studied by Roeleveld (2000). Tentacle morphology examined by Roeleveld (2002).
427 (📷)	12 January 2000 (reported)	off Ogasawara Islands, Japan {NWP}	Caught and observed	Architeuthis sp.	Multiple specimens	Not stated		None given		[Anon.] (2000a, fig.)	Widder (2021:258)	Caught as bycatch of Thysanoteuthis fishery. Part of body collected by Ogasawara Fisheries Center research vessel Koyo. Further specimens recorded off Chichijima by Sunheng Maru (entire specimen with tentacles) and Chihiro Maru. Also observed being preyed upon by sperm whales during whale watching. Severed tentacles "snagged on baited lures" reported by longline fishermen. Such reports motivated choice of Ogasawara Islands as location for 2004 expedition that produced first photographs of live giant squid in natural habitat (#492).
428	25 January 2000	off New Zealand (43°48.47′S 174°47.46′E) at 476 m depth {SWP}		Architeuthis						O'Shea (2007)		
429 (📷)	27 January 2000	off New Zealand (44°21.19'S 175°05'–174°34'E) at 615 m depth {SWP}	"Hauled up" by fishermen	Architeuthis sanctipauli	Entire	Entire		EL: 6.5 m ["lost 2.5 metres (seven feet) of its length through drying out"]; WT: 80 kg [after preservation]	MNHN	[Anon.] (2008a); [Anon.] (2008b); [MNHN] (N.d.); [Anon.] (2019a); [Anon.] (2019b)	O'Shea (2007)	On public display. Nicknamed "Wheke" after a sea monster of Māori mythology. Donated by NIWA of New Zealand to the Muséum national d'histoire naturelle in Paris. Became the first giant squid specimen to be plastinated; consolidated using structures inserted into tentacles, arms and funnel; 300 suckers reconstituted, original beak replaced, glass eyes inserted, and coloured to approximate natural appearance. Since 2008 on display on ground floor of the Gallery of Evolution (grande galerie de l'Évolution), MNHN. Restored in March 2019 by head MNHN taxidermist Christophe Gottini and assistant Vincent Cuisset over period of at least 30 hours ahead of exhibition "Ocean, an unusual dive", held from 3 April 2019 to 5 January 2020; old paint replaced. Specimen had originally been exposed to dust while still sticky, altering its appearance significantly.
430	22 March 2000	Kerguelen waters in southern Polar Frontal Zone (47°10′S 69°23′E) at 490–620 m depth {SIO}	Found in stomach contents of sleeper shark (Somniosus sp.)	Architeuthis dux	Lower and upper beak			LRL: 11.78 mm; ML: 60 cm [estimate]		Cherel (2003:1296); Cherel & Duhamel (2004:25)	Rincon (2004)	Mantle length estimated using allometric equation from Roeleveld (2000).
431	2 April 2000	Asturias, Spain {NEA}	Found in stomach contents of shortfin mako shark (Isurus oxyrinchus)	Architeuthis	Tentacle			TL: 2 m		Guerra et al. (2006:258)		Caught by Spanish vessel Teresa José from Luarca.
432	24 April 2000	Kerguelen waters in southern Polar Frontal Zone (48°26′S 70°58′E) at 680–755 m depth {SIO}	Found in stomach contents of sleeper shark (Somniosus sp.)	Architeuthis dux	Lower beak only			LRL: 11.33 mm; ML: 54 cm [estimate]		Cherel (2003:1296); Cherel & Duhamel (2004:25)	Rincon (2004)	Mantle length estimated using allometric equation from Roeleveld (2000).
433	10 May 2000	Kerguelen waters in southern Polar Frontal Zone (47°25′S 69°14′E) at 420 m depth {SIO}	Found in stomach contents of sleeper shark (Somniosus sp.)	Architeuthis dux	Lower and upper beak; broken					Cherel (2003:1296); Cherel & Duhamel (2004:25)	Rincon (2004)	
434	24 June 2000	off Recherche Bay, Tasmania, Australia {SWP}	Found floating at surface	Architeuthis sp.	Entire?	None; not collected				[TMAG] (2007:19)		Found by marine police.
(📷)	2000	off Dana Point, California, United States {NEP}	Found	Architeuthis japonica?	"floating remnants"; at least part of arm crown including one tentacle	Not stated		?TL: 20 ft (6.1 m)		Thomas (2006, fig.)		Speculated to have been attacked by "large shark" or sperm whale.
435	9 August 2000	off New Zealand; see map {SWP}	Unspecified record	Architeuthis sp.	Larva(e)			Larva(e)		O'Shea (N.d.)		
436	28 September 2000	south of Wellington, North Island; see map {SWP}	Unspecified record	Architeuthis sp.	Larva(e)			Larva(e)		O'Shea (N.d.)		
437 (📷)	20 October 2000	Fort Lauderdale, Florida, United States (Straits of Florida) (26°10′N 80°00′W; given as "26°10'N 80°W") {NWA}	Found floating at surface	Architeuthis dux	Entire, "completely intact body"; tentacles and arm tips missing	Various parts, including mantle, gladius, and pieces of head (beak and radula)	Male (mature)	ML: 3.4 ft (1.0 m); WL: 14 ft (4.3 m) [estimate]; "actual length": 7.5 ft (2.3 m)	NMNH catalog no. USNM 1111097 and field number MML 8041.00 (parts including mantle, gladius, beak, and radula) [specimen No. 19 of Roper et al. (2015)]	Roper et al. (2015:81); [NMNH] (N.d.)		Found over bottom depth of c. 2000 m. Collected by G. Varley; identified by Clyde Roper. Sample used as part of mitogenomic study of Winkelmann et al. (2013). Parts preserved in isopropyl alcohol, in dry state, and as slide.
438	15 December 2000	in the vicinity of Amsterdam Island (37°50′S 77°33′E) {SIO}	Found floating at surface	Architeuthis dux	"large mantle"; head and gladius missing	Two funnel locking cartilages and one nuchal cartilage		Funnel locking cartilages: 146/148 mm; Nuchal cartilage: "large"		Cherel (2003:1295)		Collected by French trawler Austral. Atlantic yellow-nosed albatross (Diomedea chlororhynchos) observed feeding on corpse. Fishermen reported two other specimens of large squid observed in previous weeks.
439	Unknown	east of Palmerston North, North Island; see map {SWP}	Unspecified record	Architeuthis sp.	Larva(e)			Larva(e)		O'Shea (N.d.)		
440 (📷)	Unknown (reported 2001 or slightly earlier)	Hawaii {NEP}	Found floating at surface after having "had a tangle with a shark"	Architeuthis	Entire, bearing bite marks	Not specified		WT: 175 lb (79 kg) [estimate]		[Anon.] (c. 2001); O'Shea (2005)		Found by crew of the Illusions charter boat "while filming a TV show with Capt. Norm Issacs for ESPN". Photographed reconstructed on jetty, with head, limbs and anterior portion of mantle shown ventrally, but (detached) finned posterior end of mantle arranged dorsally.

== Specimen images ==
The following images relate to 20th century giant squid specimens and sightings. The number below each image corresponds to that given in the List of giant squid table and is linked to the relevant record therein. The date on which the specimen was first documented is also given (the little-endian day/month/year date format is used throughout).

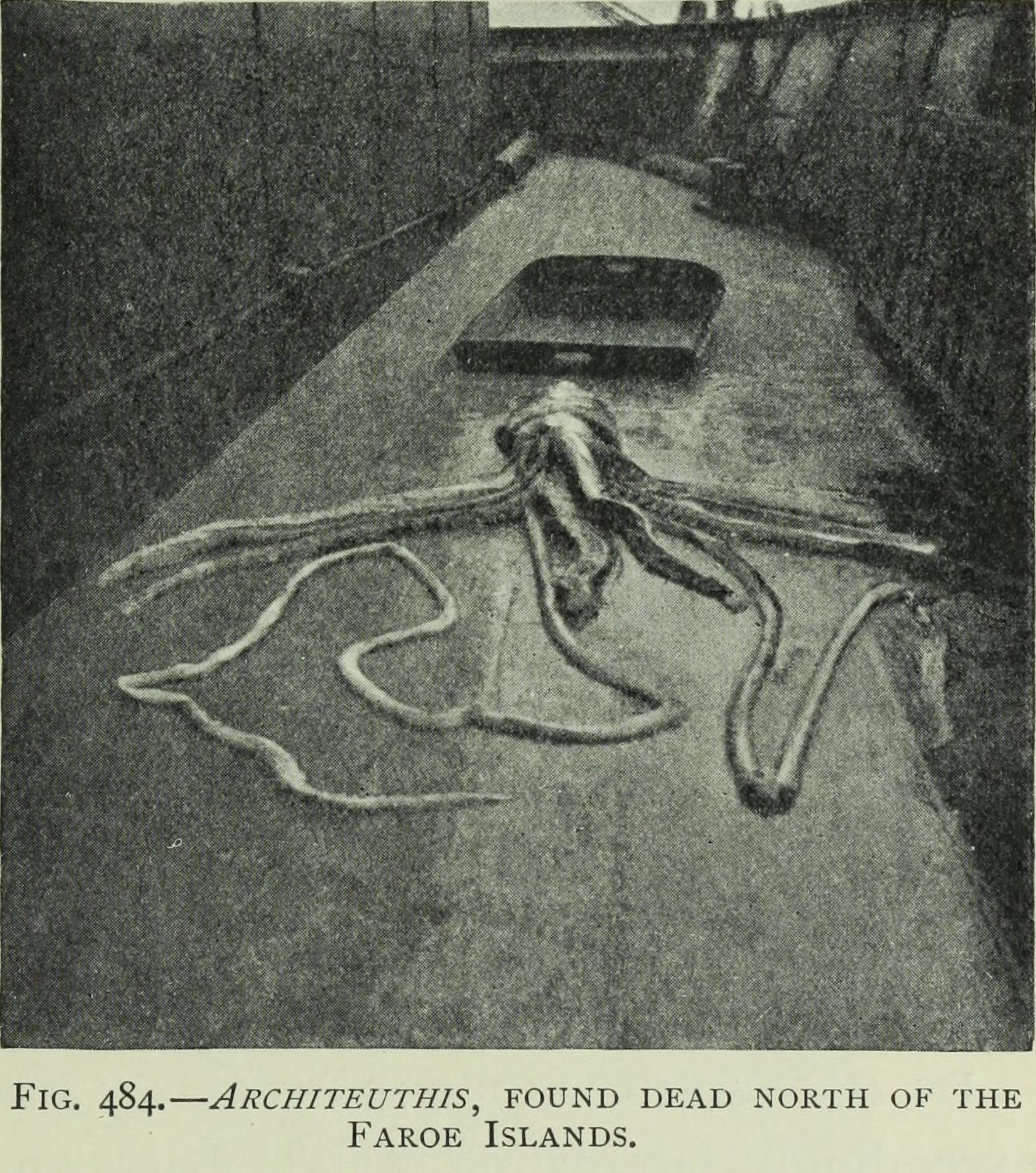
#72 (?/?/1902)
Giant squid carcass found floating at the surface north of the Faroe Islands in 1902 (Murray & Hjort, 1912:651, fig. 484). It is shown here on the deck of the Michael Sars.

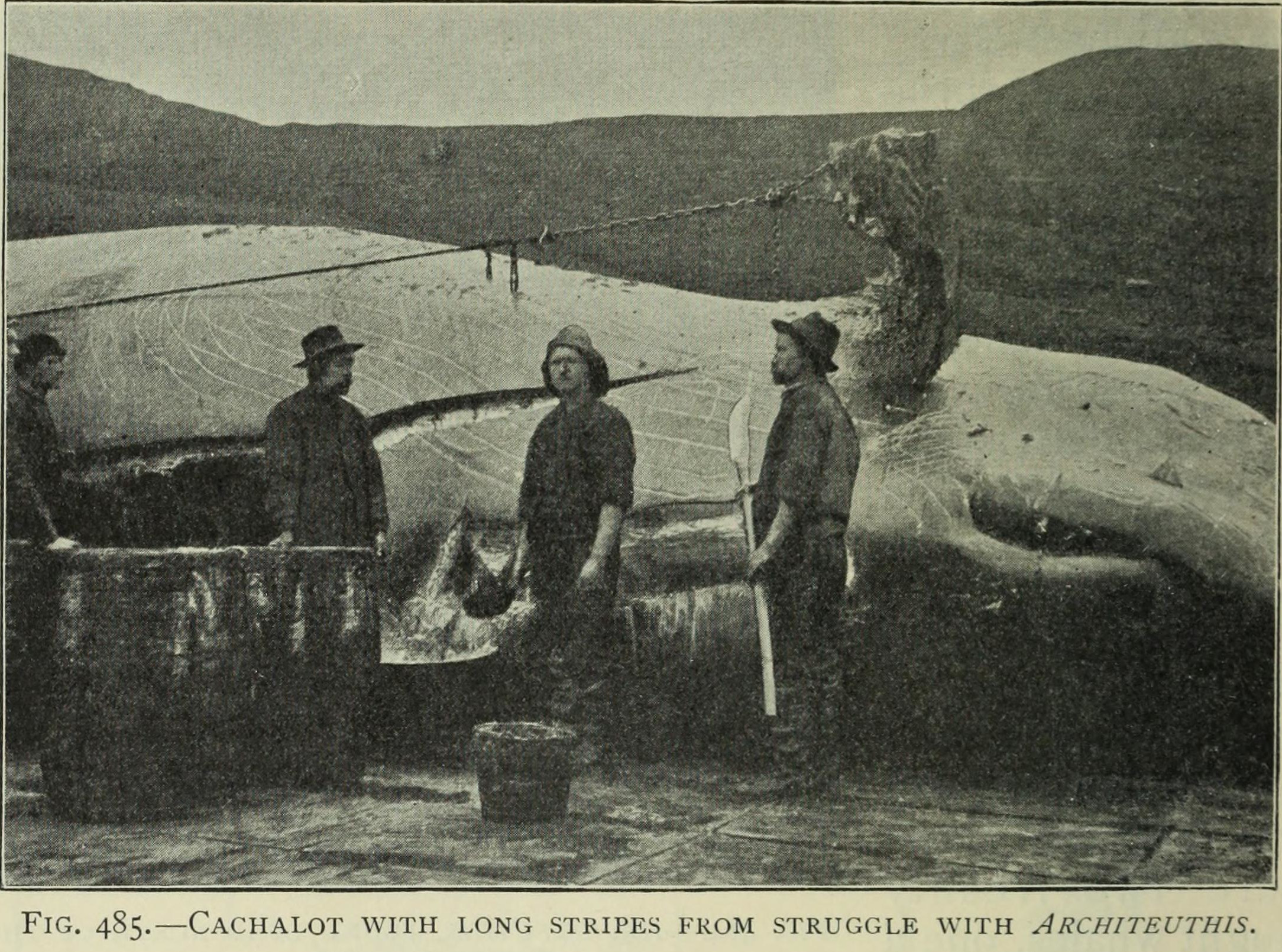
#73 (15/8/1903)
Sperm whale in whose jaws a giant squid tentacle fragment was found (Murray & Hjort, 1912:652, fig. 485). The "long stripes" visible on the head consisted of putative giant squid sucker scars around an inch (2.5 cm) across.

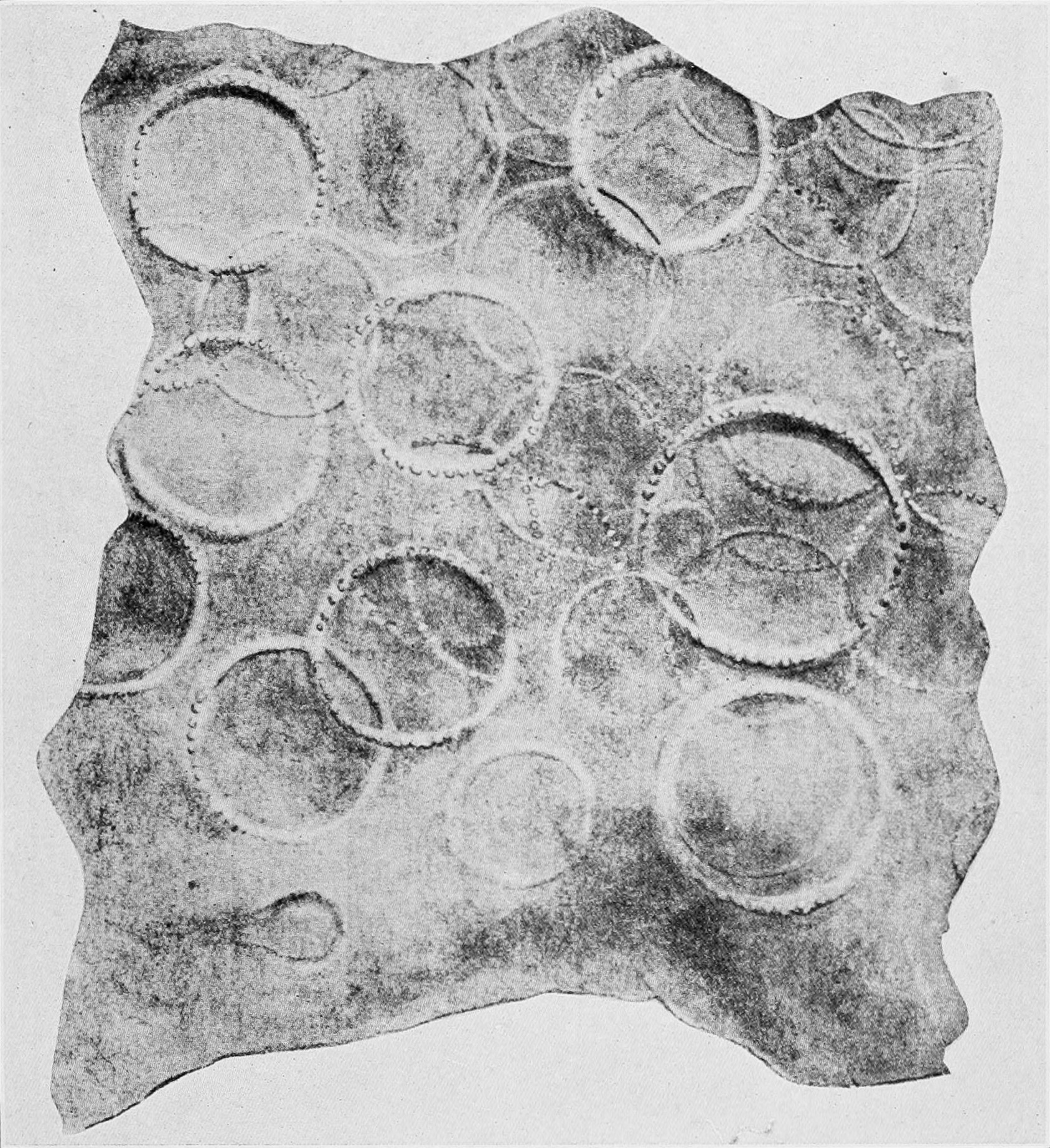
#73 (15/8/1903)
A portion of skin from the same sperm whale, bearing putative giant squid sucker scars (Murray & Hjort, 1912:653, fig. 486). In this widely reproduced image the scars measure around 27 mm (1.1 in) across.

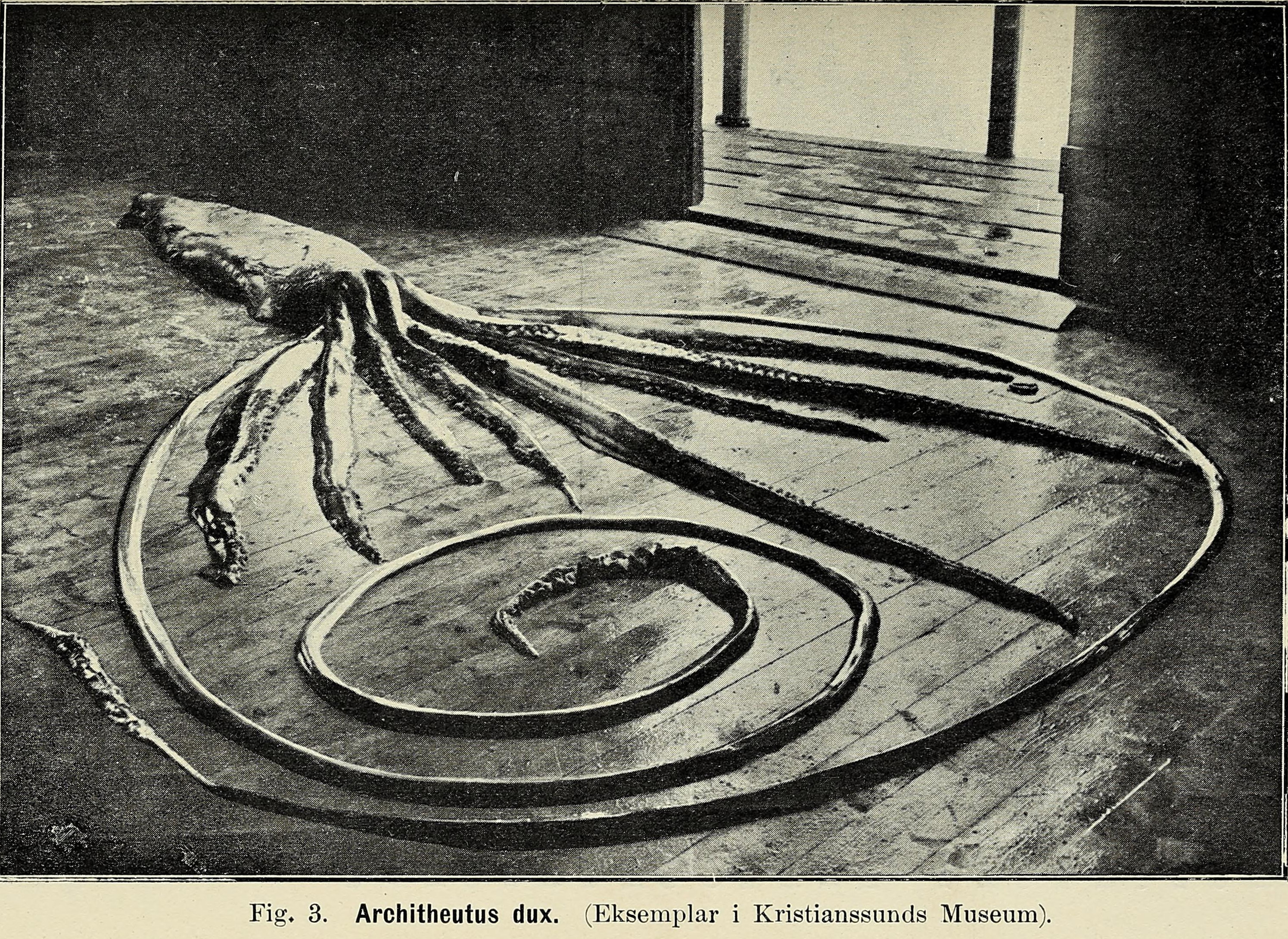
#81 (?/2/1912)
Giant squid found in shallow water in Veiholmen, Smøla, Norway, in February 1912 (Brinkmann, 1916:181, fig. 3)

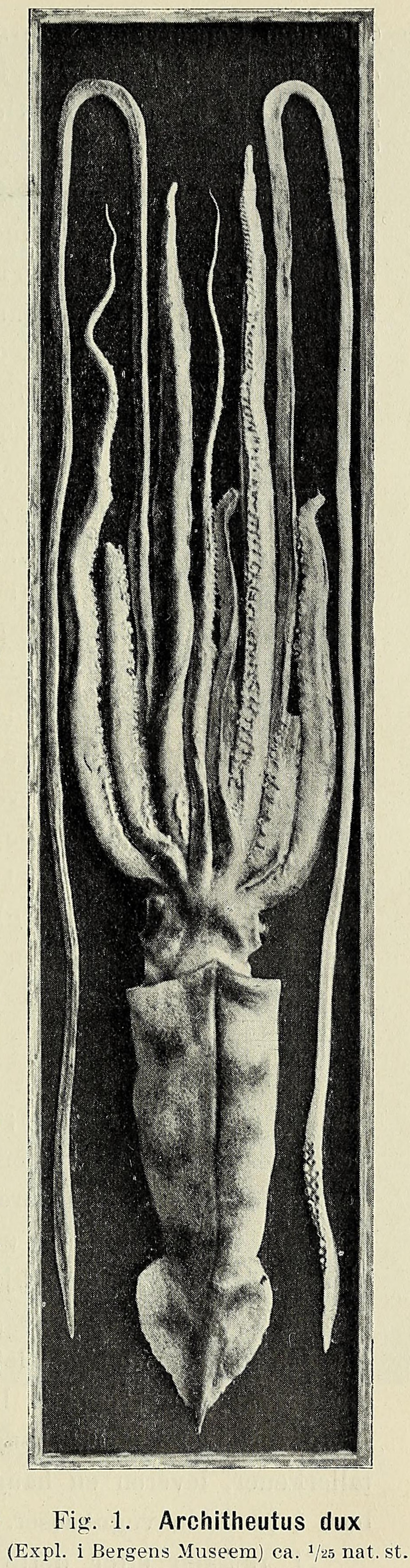
#85 (22/11/1915)
Specimen found washed ashore north of Bergen, Norway, on 22 November 1915 (Brinkmann, 1916:177, fig. 1)

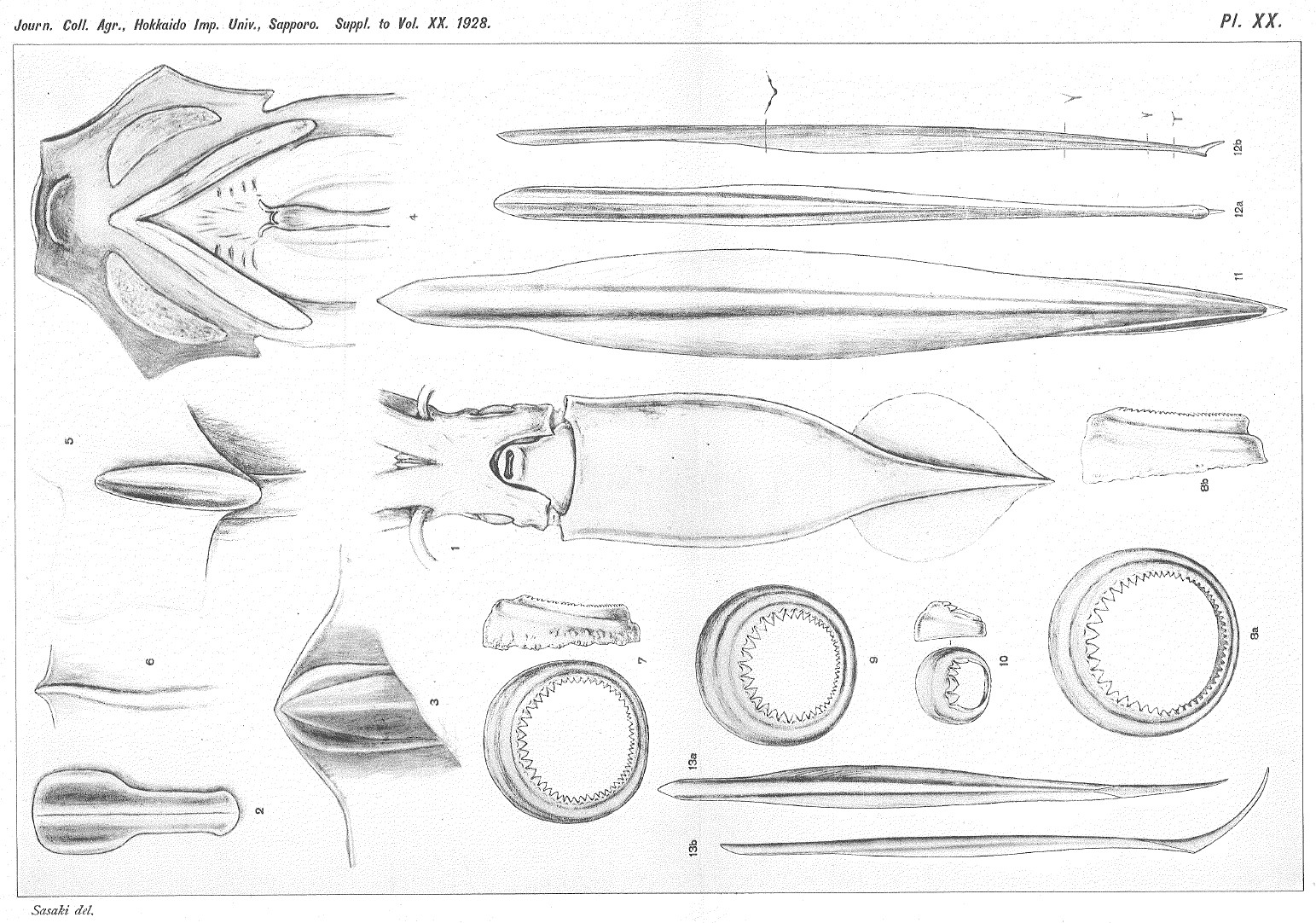
#89 (10/1/1918)
Ventral view and details of the mature male giant squid obtained by Madoka Sasaki from a Tokyo fish market on 10 January 1918. Also shown are gladii (internal shell remnants) of two other squid species: Onychoteuthis banksii (fig. 12) and Onykia loennbergii (fig. 13).

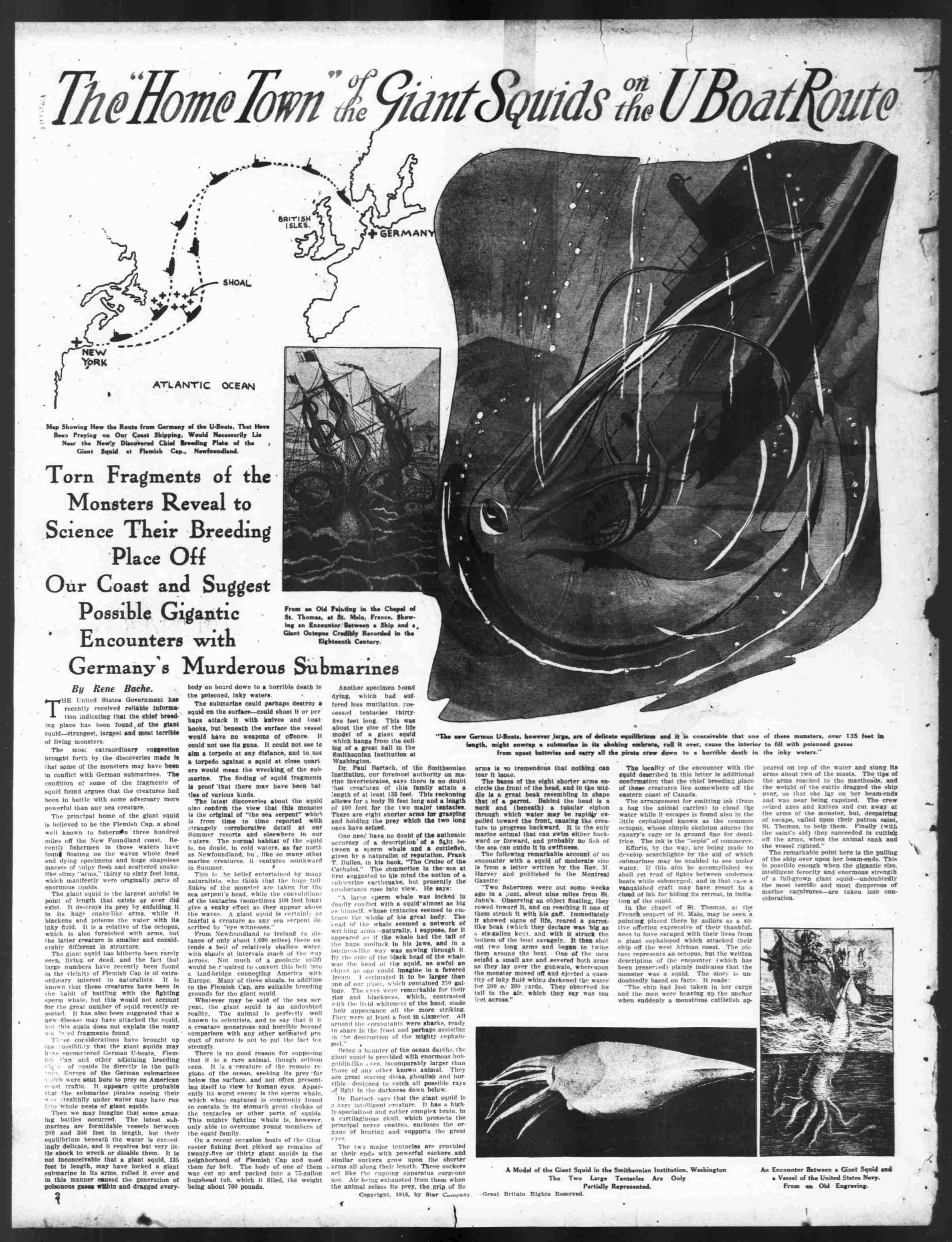
British newspaper article from 1918, speculating about possible encounters between giant squid and German U-boats. Reference is made to "fragments of squid" in such condition that the animals must have "been in battle with some adversary more powerful than any sea creature".

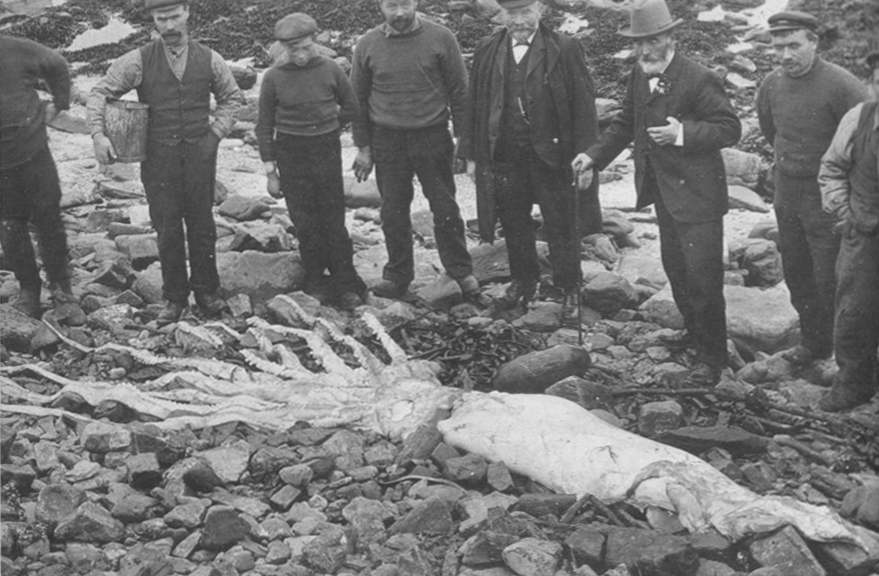
?#94 (?/?/1922)
Giant squid found washed ashore at Keiss, Caithness, Scotland, per The Wick Society (see also wider view). According to Bright (1989:64–65), who does not specify a date, this specimen "came ashore on the Scottish west coast" (emphasis added). Heuvelmans (2003:fig. 113), who likewise provides no date, gives the locality as "the east coast of Scotland".

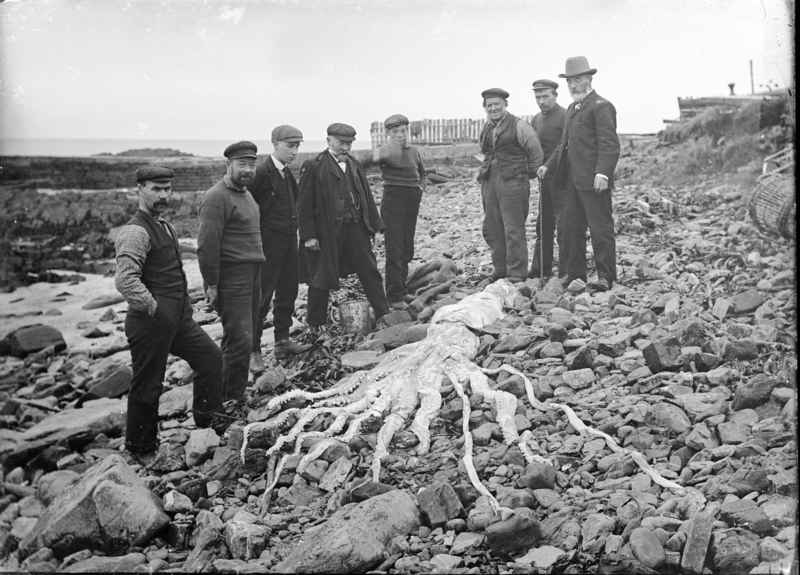
?#94 (?/?/1922)
Another view of the Keiss specimen (see alternate take)

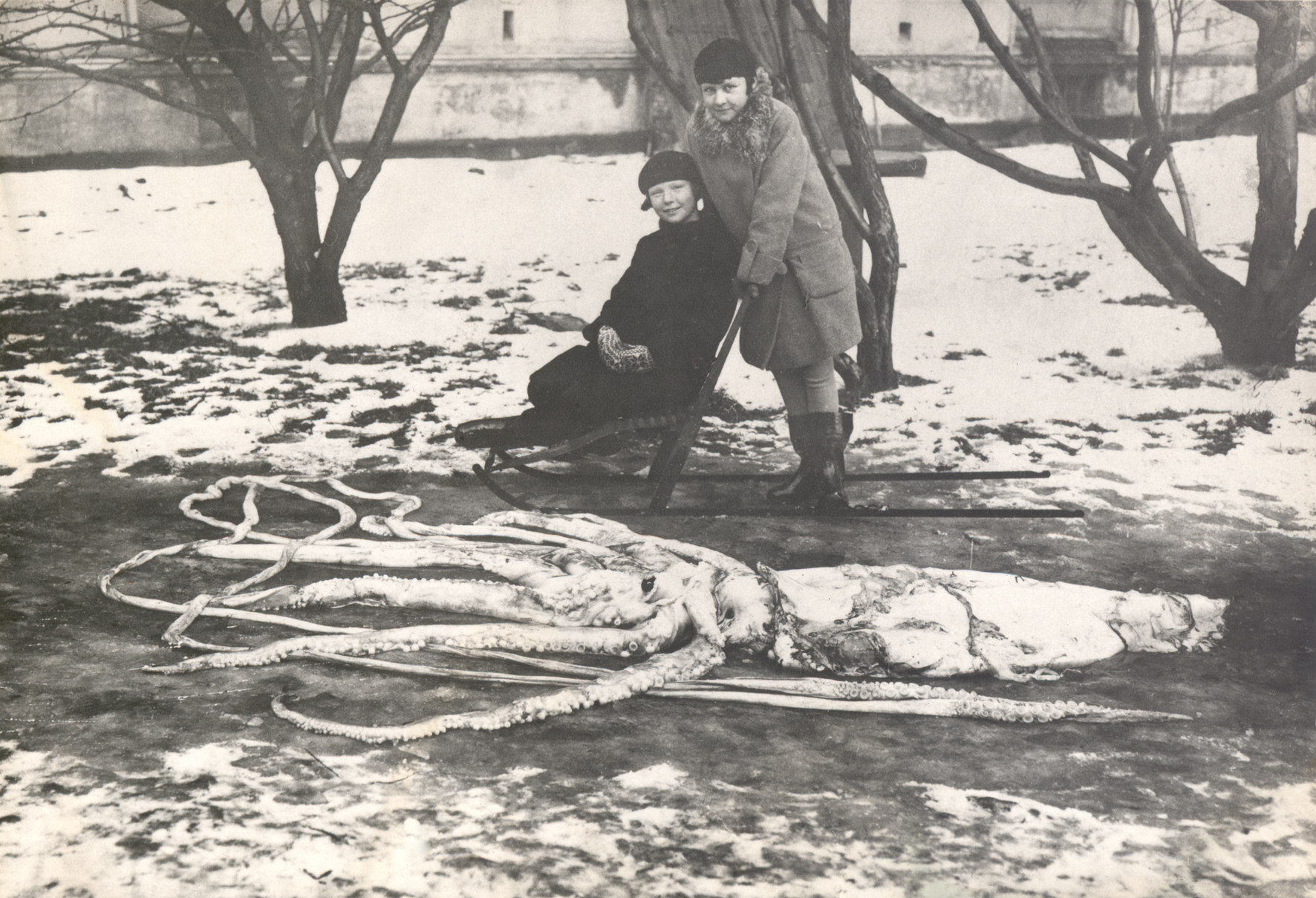
#101 (4/3/1928)
Specimen found washed ashore in Ranheim, Norway, measuring around 7.9 m in total length

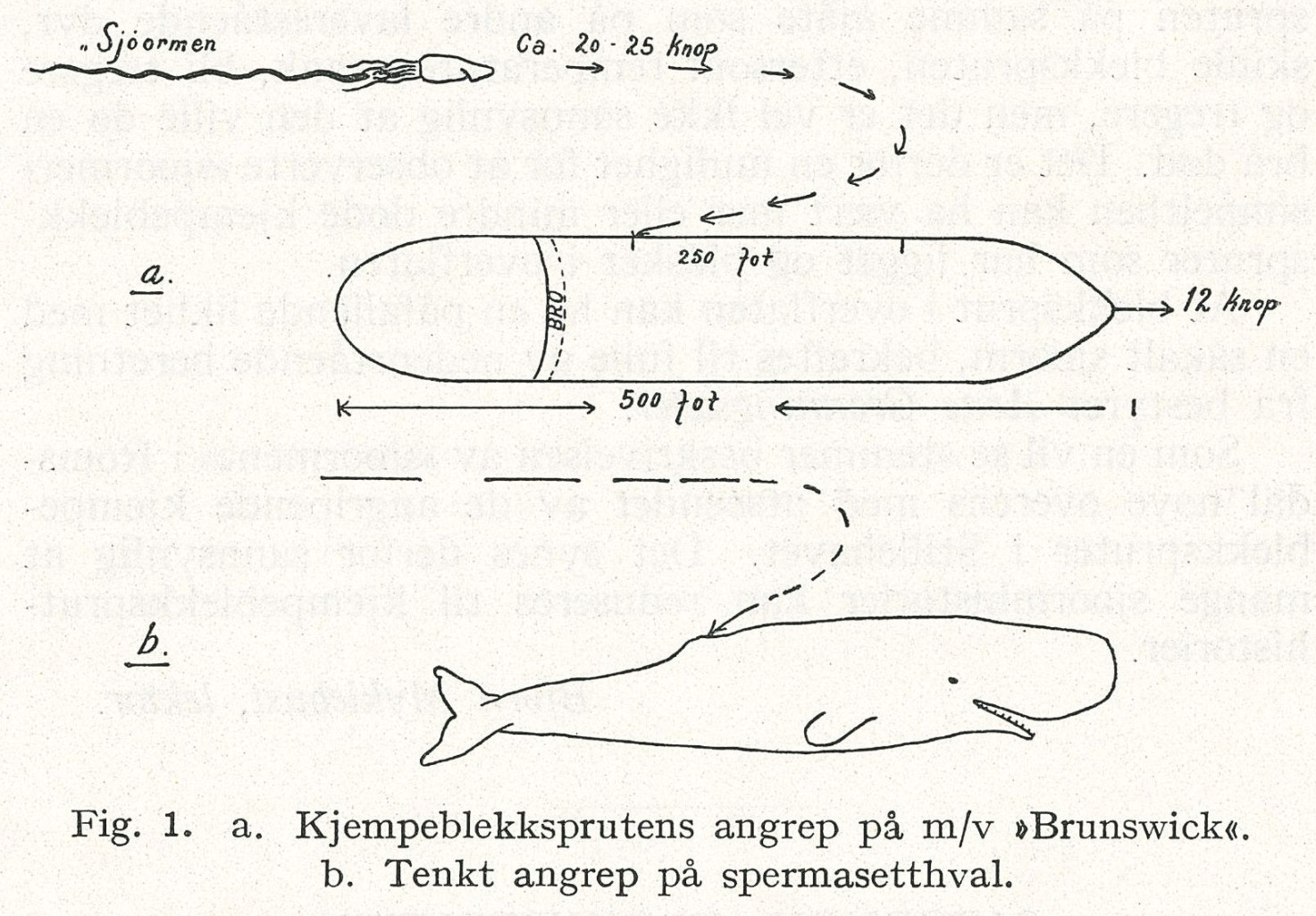
#106 (1930–1933)
Arne Grønningsæter's sketch of his supposed encounter with a giant squid in the open ocean between Hawaii and Samoa in 1930–1933 (Grønningsæter, 1946:380, fig. 1). The animal was observed swimming at 20–25 kn (37–46 km/h) alongside a 15,000-ton freighter before turning towards the ship, colliding with the hull, skidding along it, and being ground to pieces by the propeller.

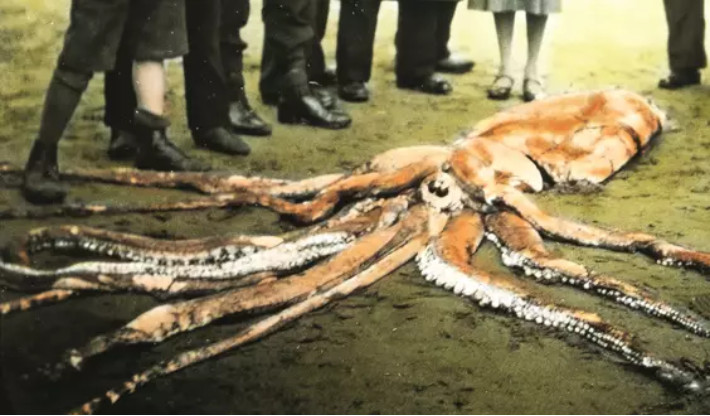
#107 (14/1/1933)
Hand-coloured black-and-white photograph of the giant squid found washed ashore on Scarborough's south beach, England, on 14 January 1933, from a magic lantern slide (c. 1930s) as featured in Robin Lidster's Scarborough From Old Photographs

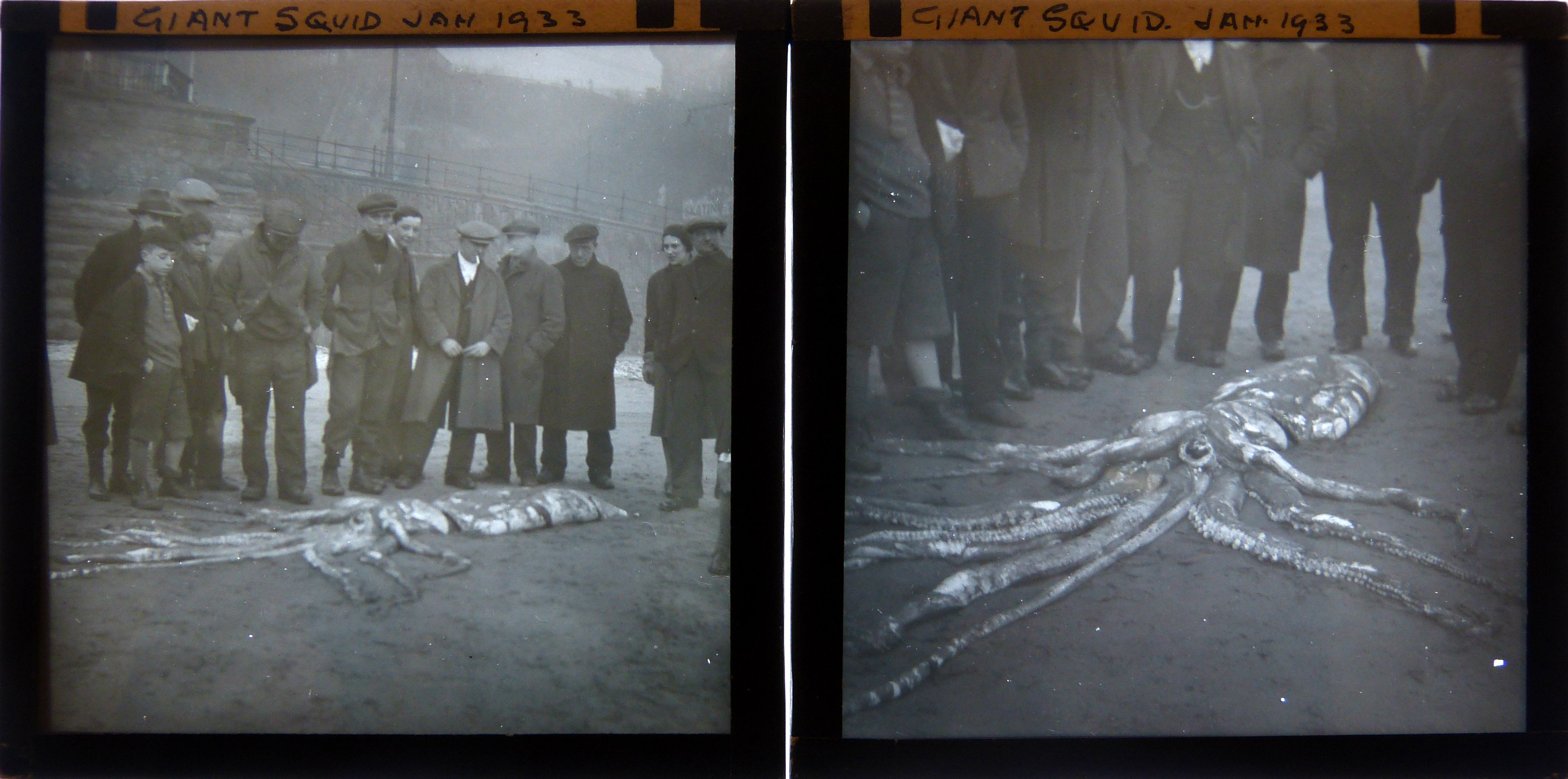
#107 (14/1/1933)
Further photographs showing a crowd gathering around the beached carcass (see also wider views of left frame and right frame)

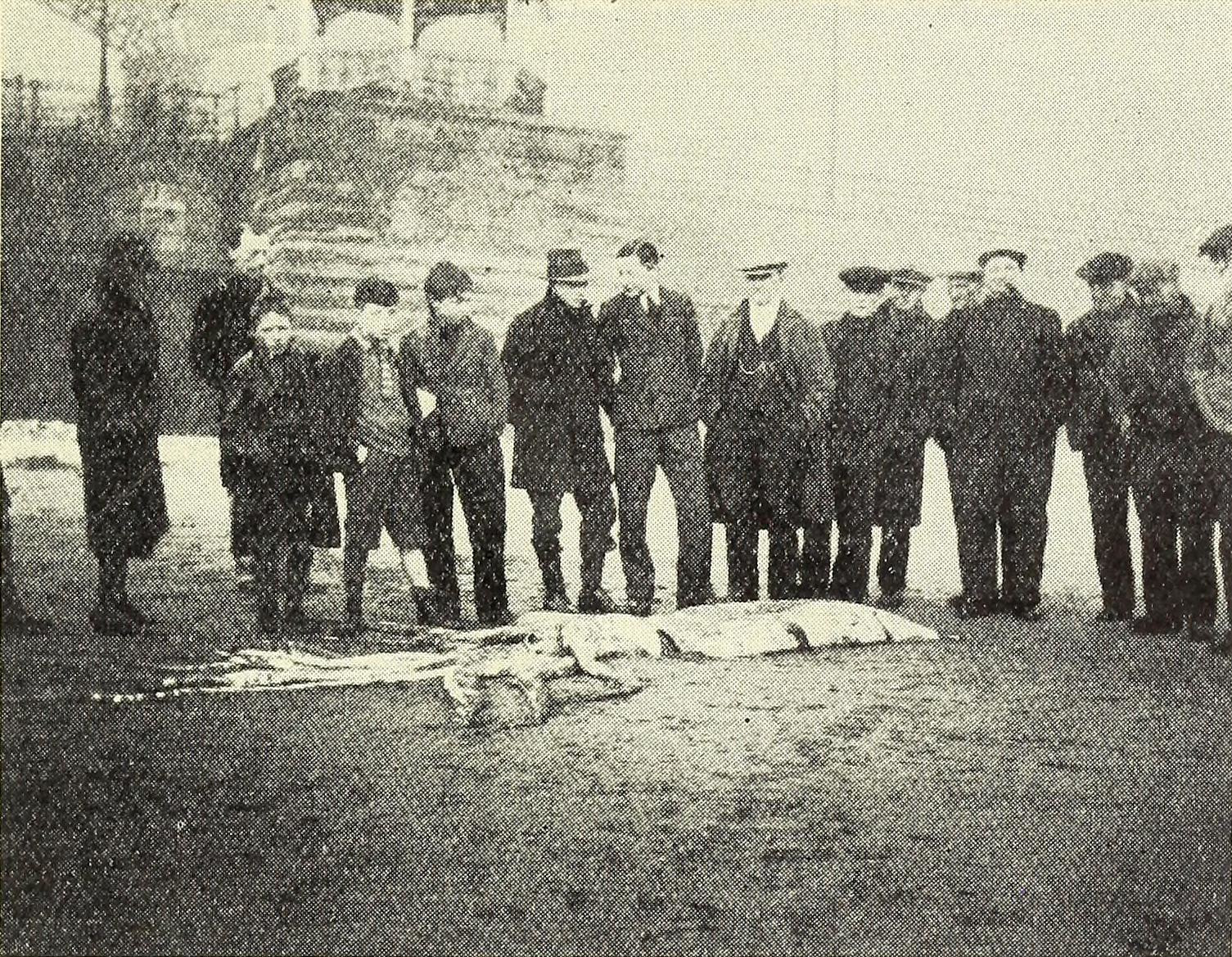
#107 (14/1/1933)
Locals standing beside the Scarborough giant squid (Clarke, 1933:157, fig.; see also hand-coloured magic lantern slide of same)

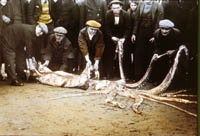
#107 (14/1/1933)
Photograph taken by William James Clarke, after whom the specimen was described as Architeuthis clarkei, from a plate hand coloured by him (see also wider view from magic lantern slide of same)

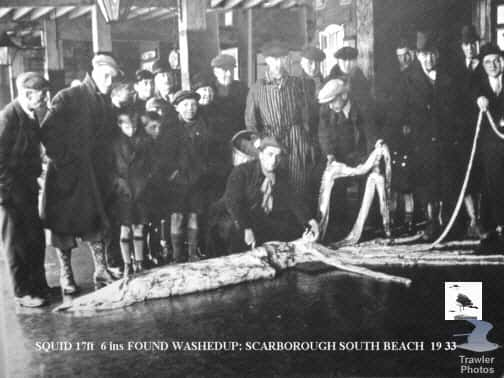
#107 (14/1/1933)
The same specimen on display at Scarborough fish market

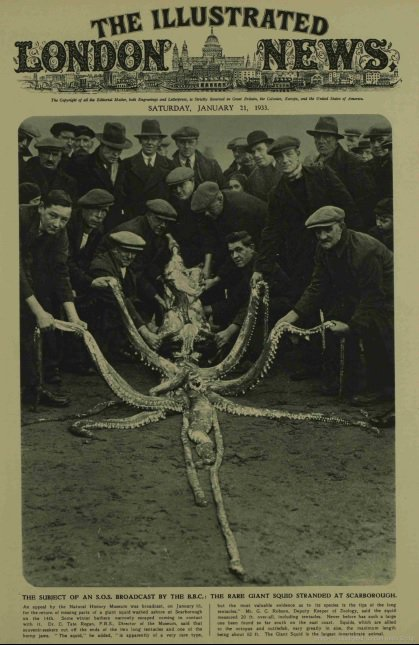
#107 (14/1/1933)
The specimen was featured on the cover of The Illustrated London News on 21 January 1933, a week after its discovery

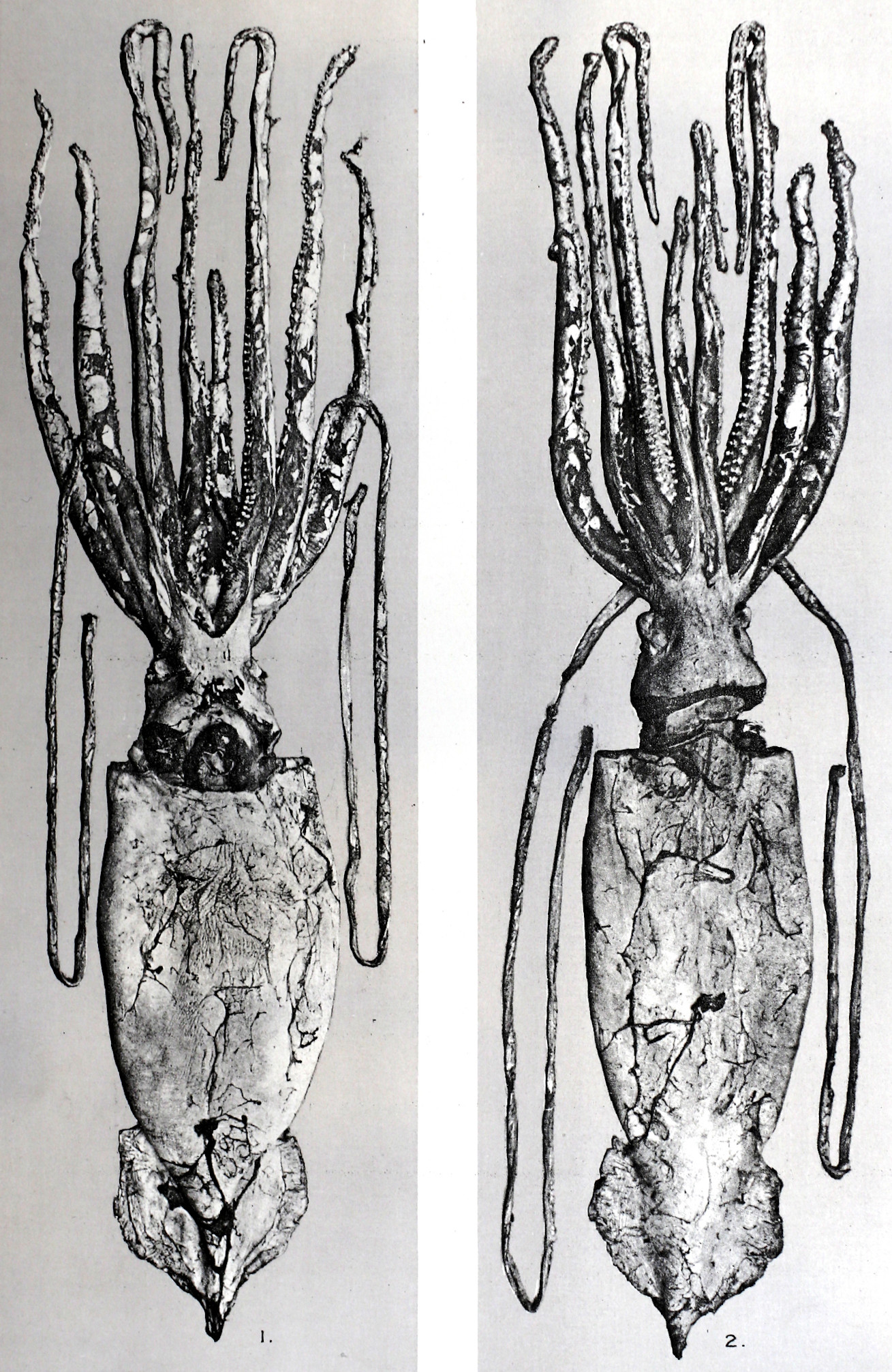
#107 (14/1/1933)
Ventral (left) and dorsal views of the specimen after it had been transferred to the Natural History Museum in London, from the type description of Robson (1933). Robson wrote that "the exaggerated narrowness of the head is due to the sagging of the sides of the mantle".

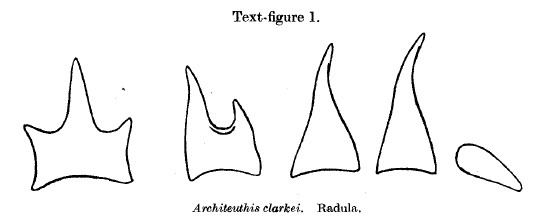
#107 (14/1/1933)
Radular teeth of the Scarborough giant squid (Robson, 1933:683, text-fig. 1; see also lateral tooth)

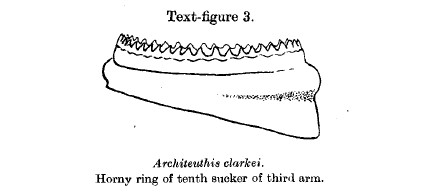
#107 (14/1/1933)
Horny ring of tenth sucker of arm III (Robson, 1933:684, text-fig. 3; see also first sucker of same)

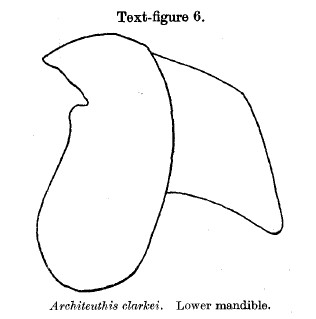
#107 (14/1/1933)
Lower beak of the Scarborough specimen; the upper beak was not well preserved (Robson, 1933:687, text-fig. 6)

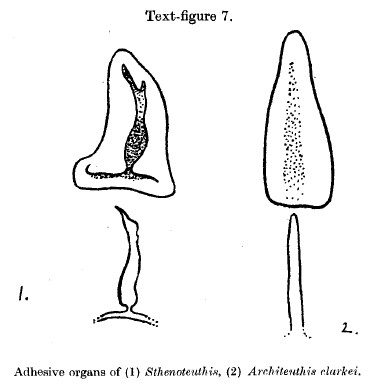
#107 (14/1/1933)
Funnel–mantle locking apparatus of the giant squid (right), which Robson (1933:696) considered "remarkably feeble and ill-developed or degenerate" as compared to the "very efficient" apparatus of Sthenoteuthis (left) (Robson, 1933:688, text-fig. 7)

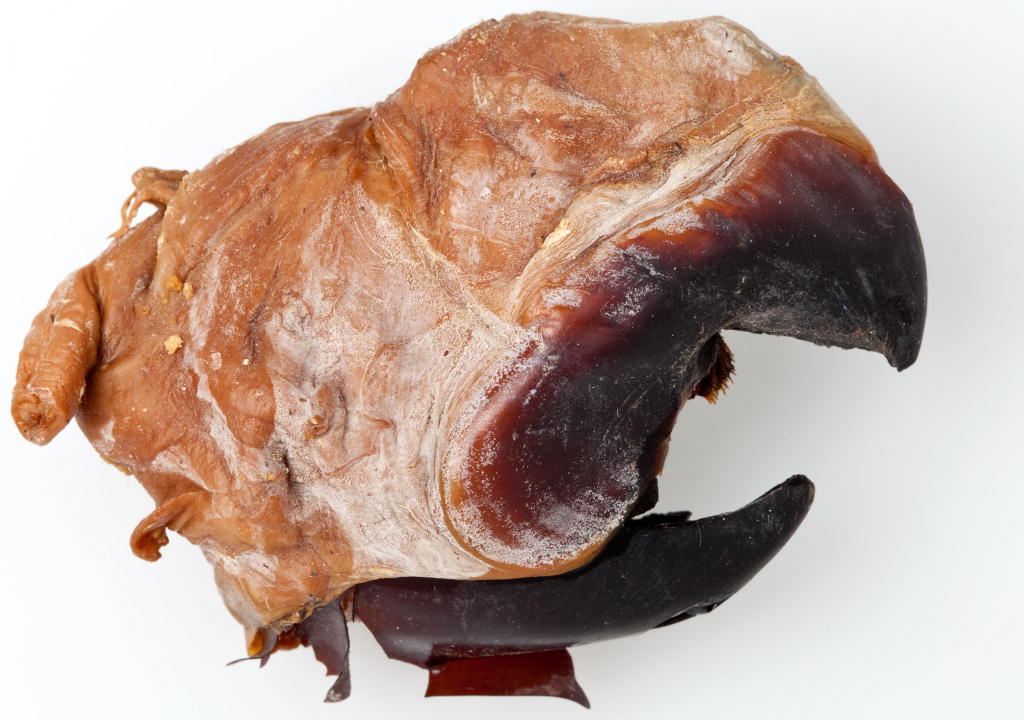
#108 (2/6/1933)
Beak of a large squid tentatively identified as "Architeuthis sp." and said to have originated from Lairg, Scotland, preserved at London's Natural History Museum, where it was accessioned on 2 June 1933 (see also other side)

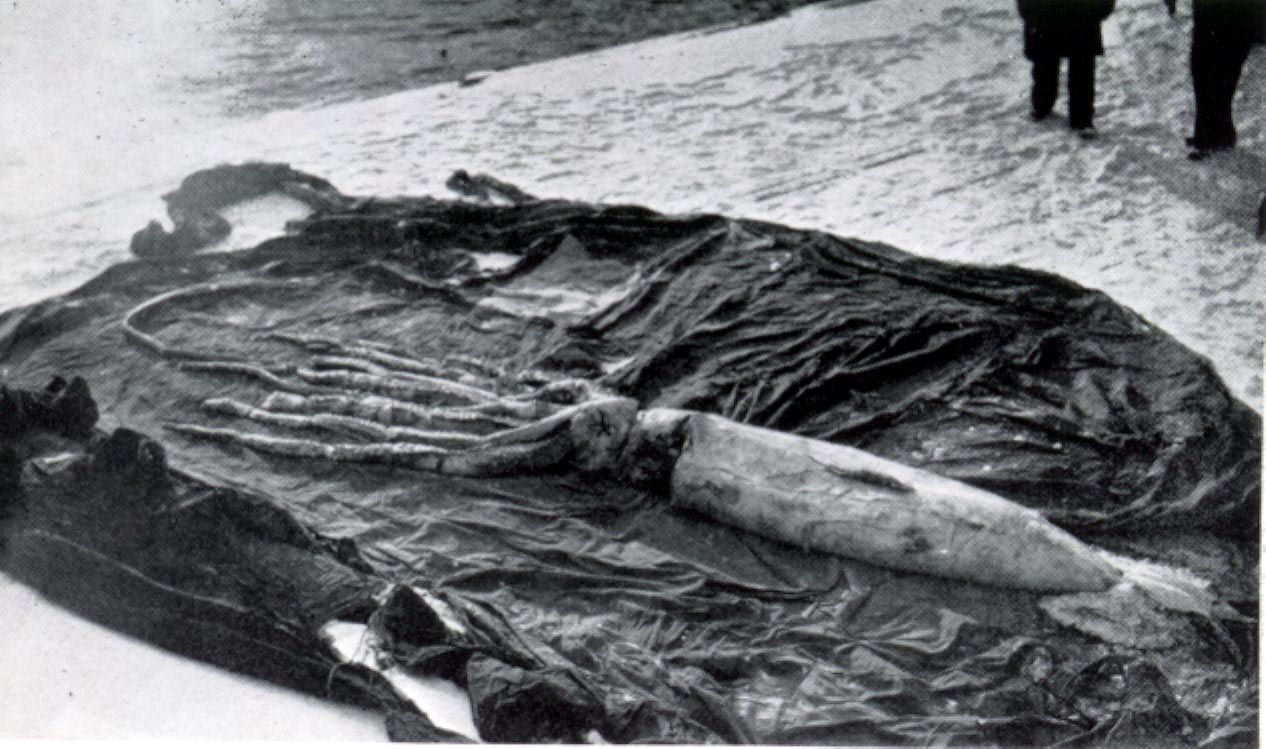
#109 (?/12/1933)
Giant squid found near Dildo, Newfoundland, in December 1933, stretched out on a tarpaulin. Photograph by E. Maunder, taken when the squid was landed at St. John's (Frost, 1934:114 & pl. 1).

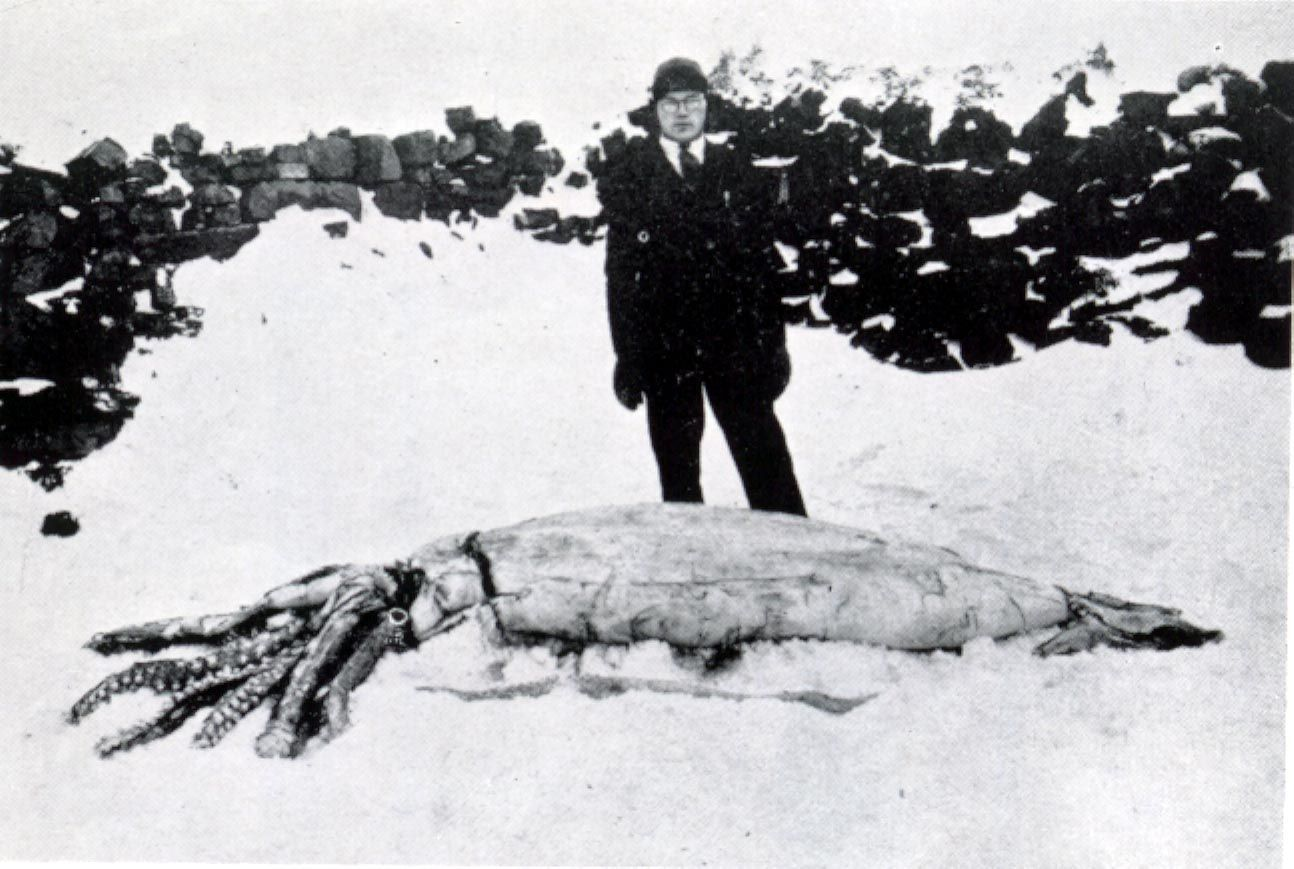
#109 (?/12/1933)
Photograph by A. Proctor of the Dildo specimen in lateral view, the detached head and caudal ("tail") section placed in approximately natural positions (Frost, 1934:114 & pl. 1).

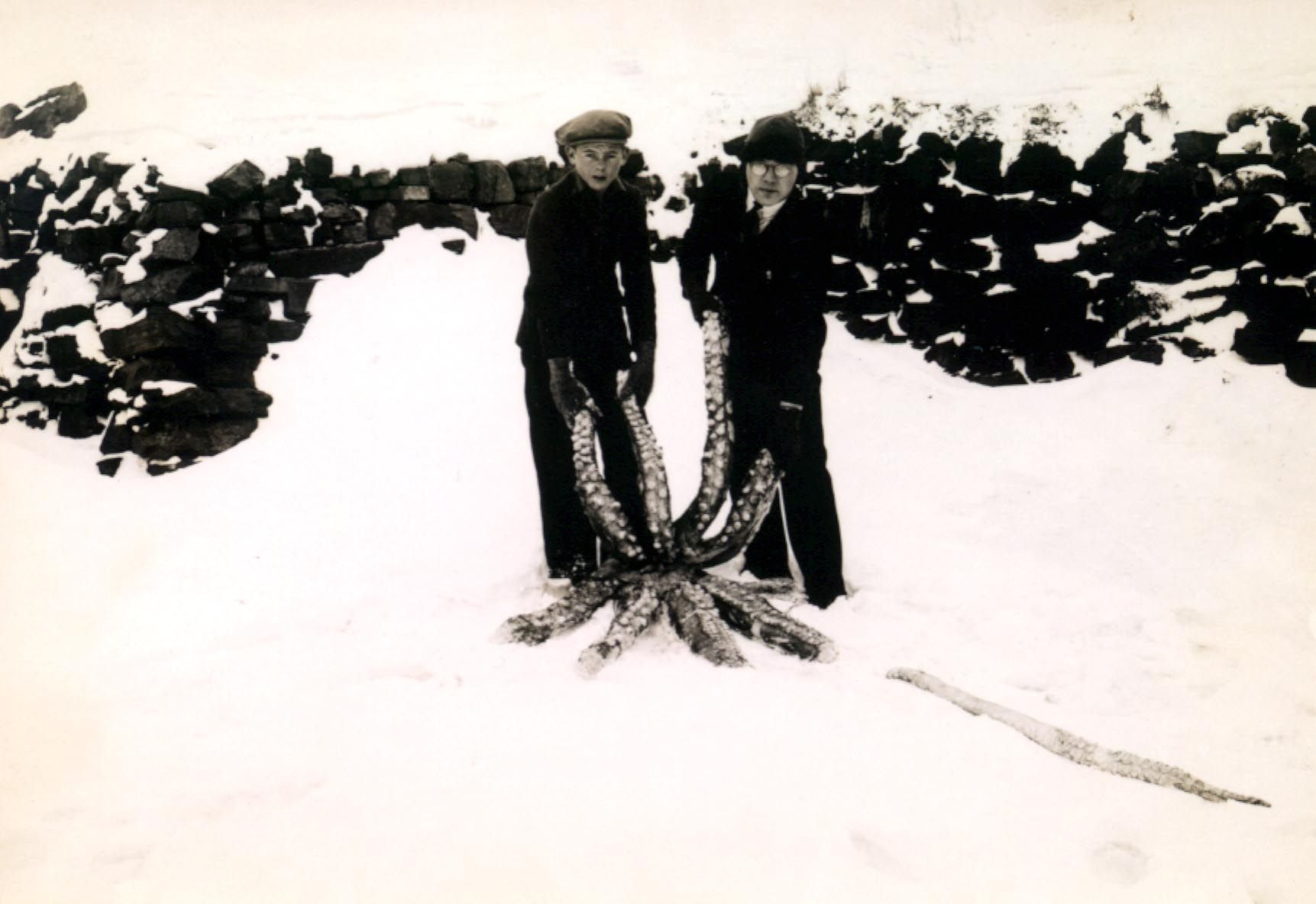
#109 (?/12/1933)
Oral view of the Dildo giant squid

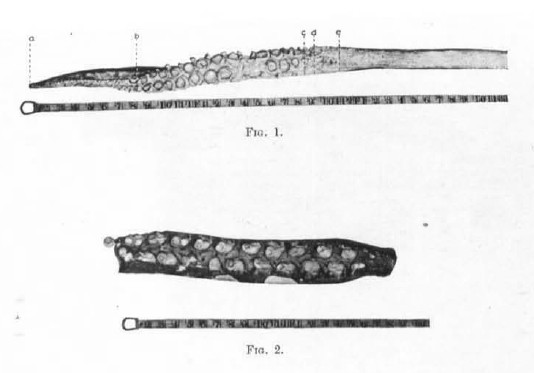
#109 (?/12/1933)
Tentacular club (fig. 1) and basal portion of the arm (fig. 2) of the Dildo specimen, from Frost (1934:114 & pl. 2)

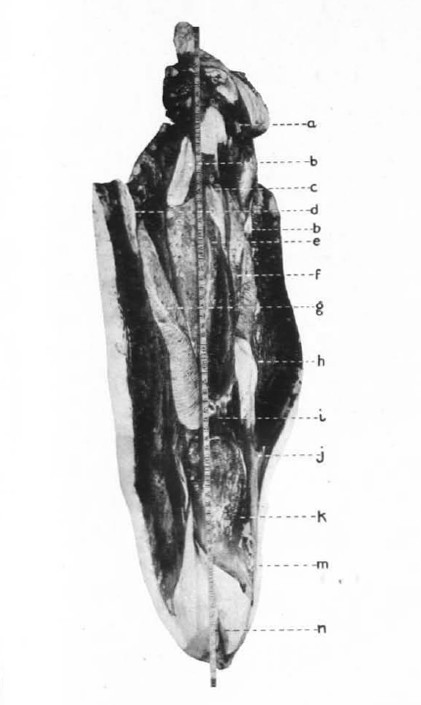
#109 (?/12/1933)
Dissected mantle showing internal organs (Frost, 1934:114 & pl. 3; see also labelled diagram of same and caudal fin)

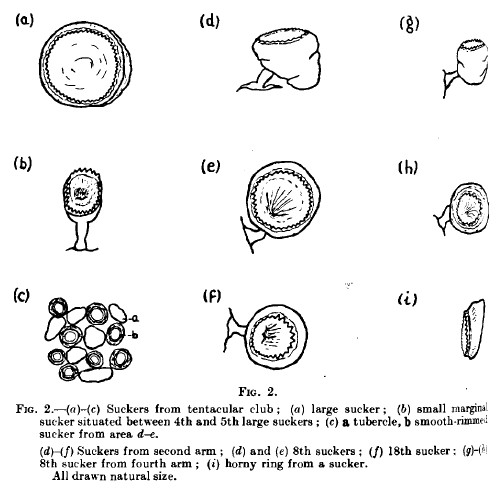
#109 (?/12/1933)
Various suckers from the tentacular club and arms of the Dildo specimen (Frost, 1934:108, fig. 2)

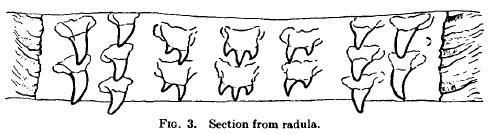
#109 (?/12/1933)
Details of the radular teeth (Frost, 1934:109, fig. 3; see also teeth of the membrane lining the palate)

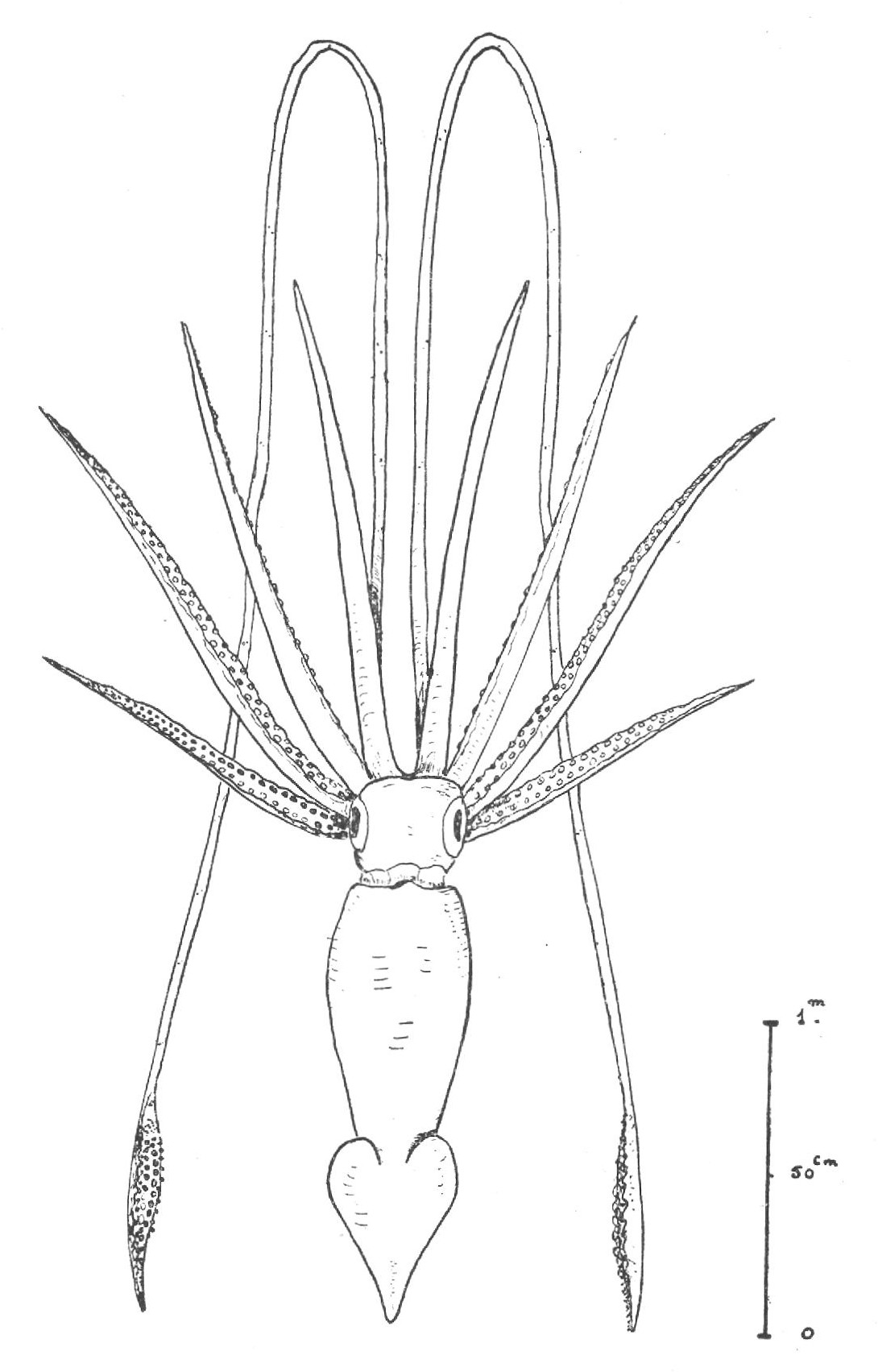
#110 (26/6/1935)
Semi-schematic illustration of the giant squid taken by trawl in the Bay of Biscay on 26 June 1935, from Cadenat (1936:278, fig. 1)

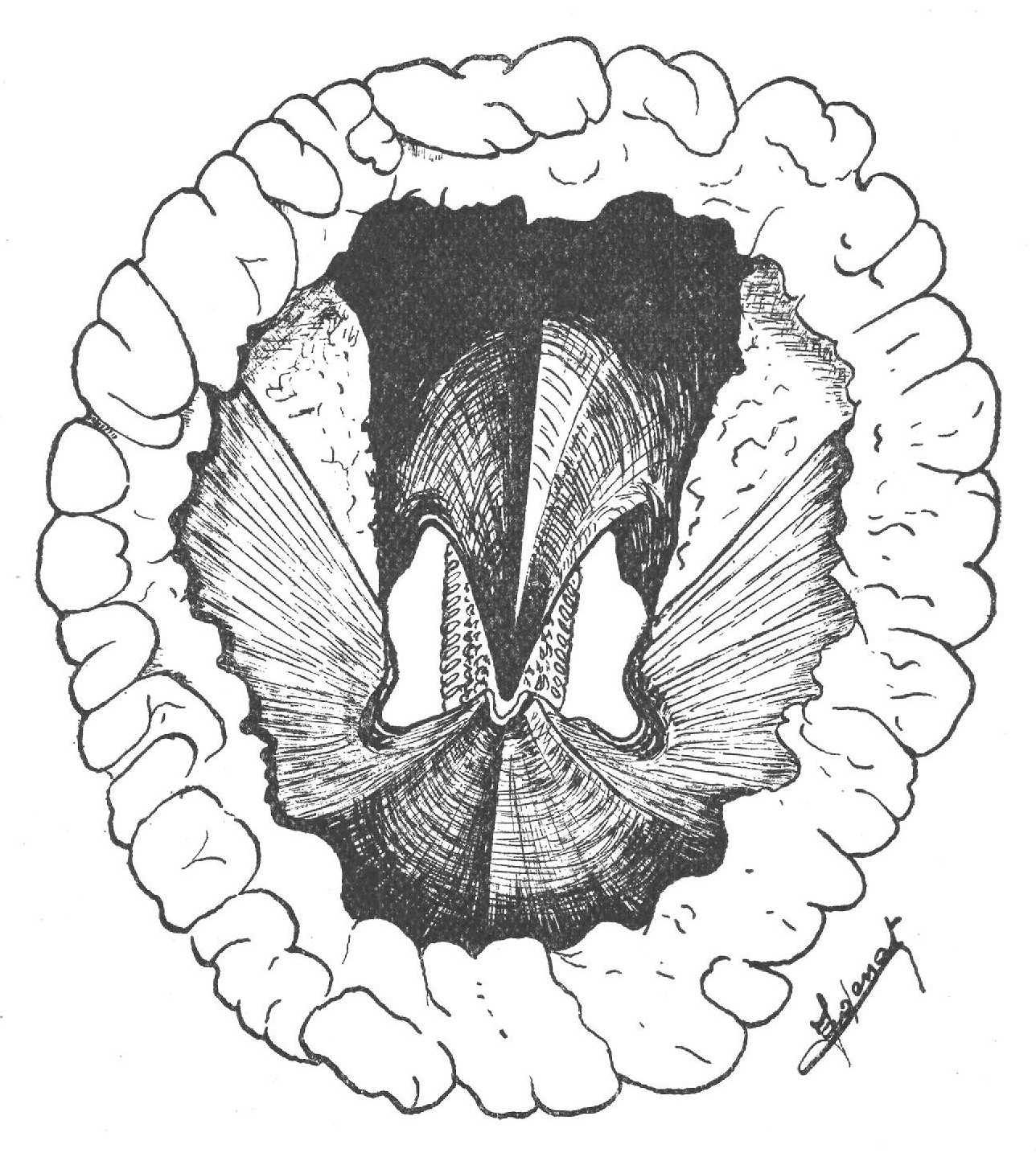
#110 (26/6/1935)
The beak and surrounding musculature of the Bay of Biscay giant squid (Cadenat, 1936:281, fig. 2)

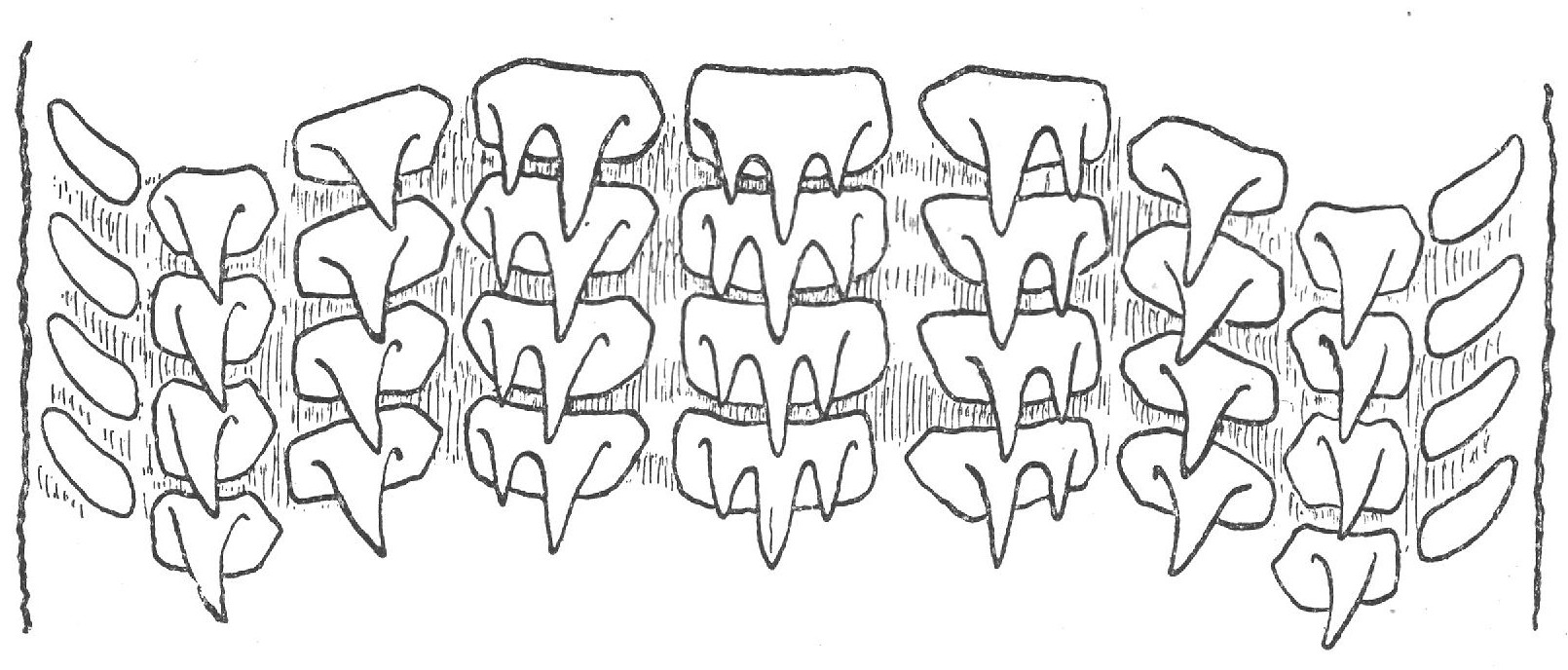
#110 (26/6/1935)
Details of the radular teeth of the same specimen (Cadenat, 1936:282, fig. 3)

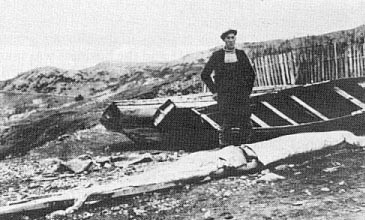
#111 (12/11/1935)
Joe Ezekiel of Harbour Main, Newfoundland, with the giant squid he found off Holyrood on 12 November 1935 (see wider view)

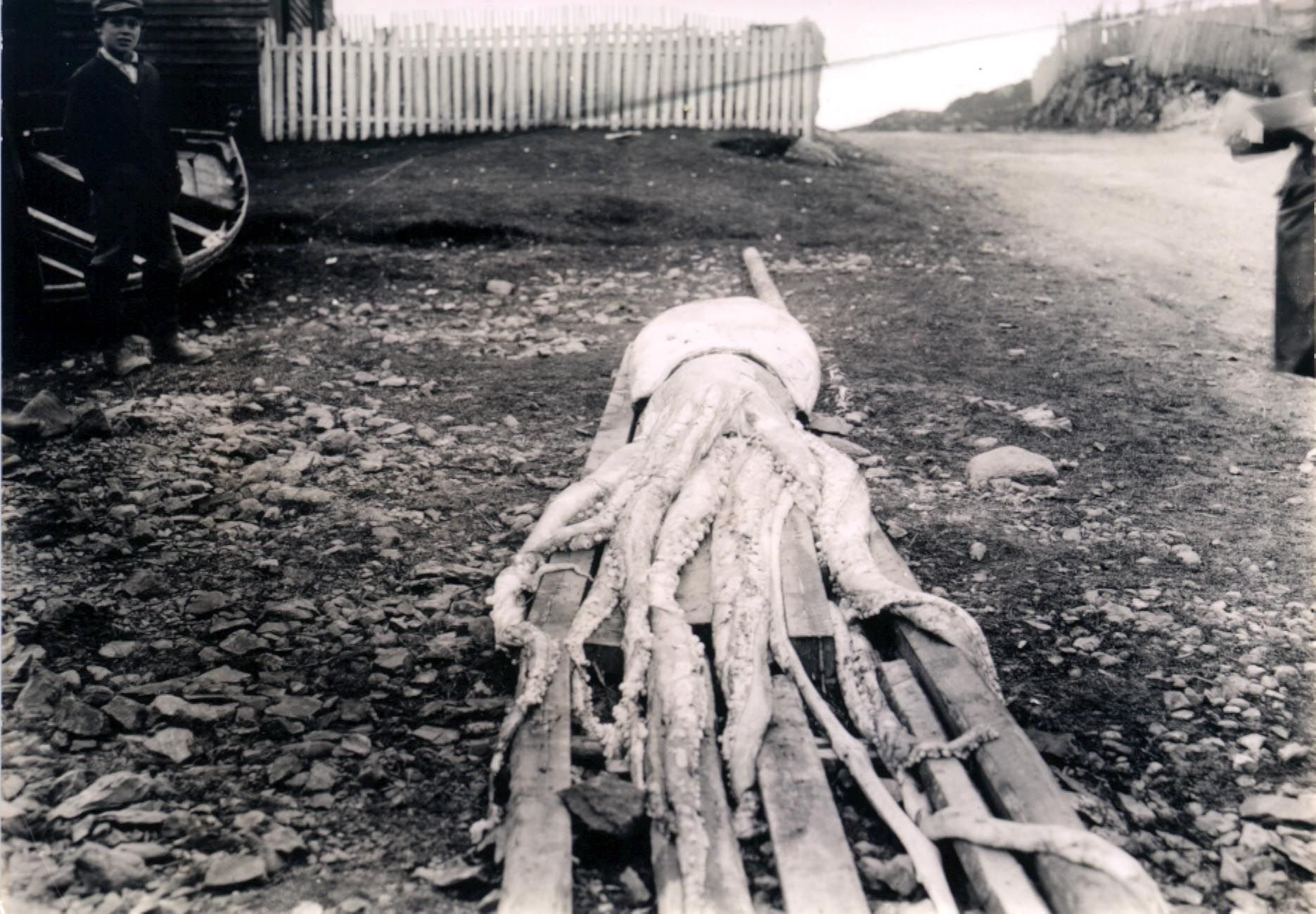
#111 (12/11/1935)
Another view of the Holyrood specimen, which was destroyed in a fire shortly after its capture

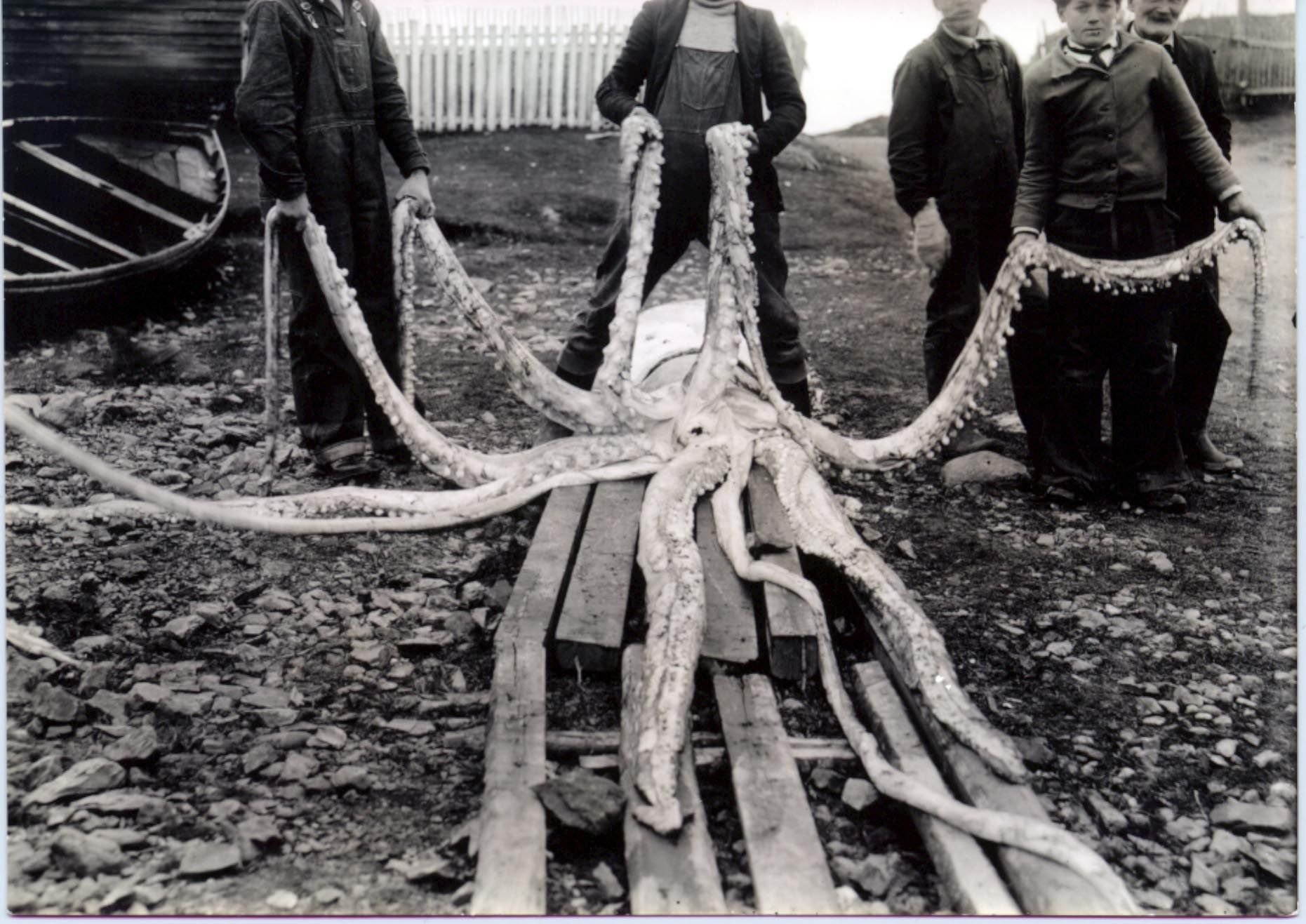
#111 (12/11/1935)
The Holyrood specimen spread out on wooden planks, its arms held aloft by Joe Ezekiel and other locals

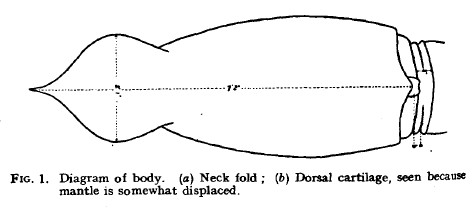
#111 (12/11/1935)
Mantle and occipital region of Holyrood specimen, from Frost (1936:90, fig. 1) (see also funnel–mantle locking apparatus, digestive system and liver, and terminal portion of rectum)

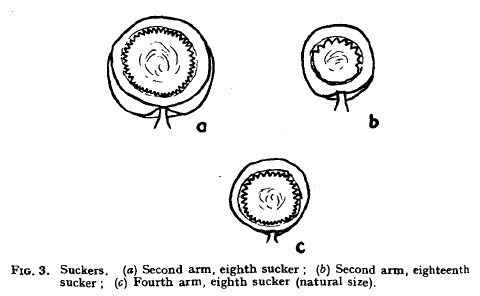
#111 (12/11/1935)
Suckers of arms II and IV (Frost, 1936:92, fig. 3)

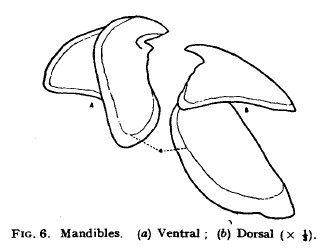
#111 (12/11/1935)
Upper and lower beaks (Frost, 1936:93, fig. 6; see also radular teeth)

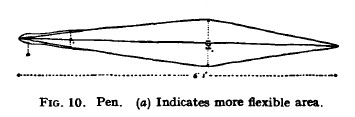
#111 (12/11/1935)
Gladius (internal shell remnant), with more flexible area indicated (Frost, 1936:94, fig. 10)

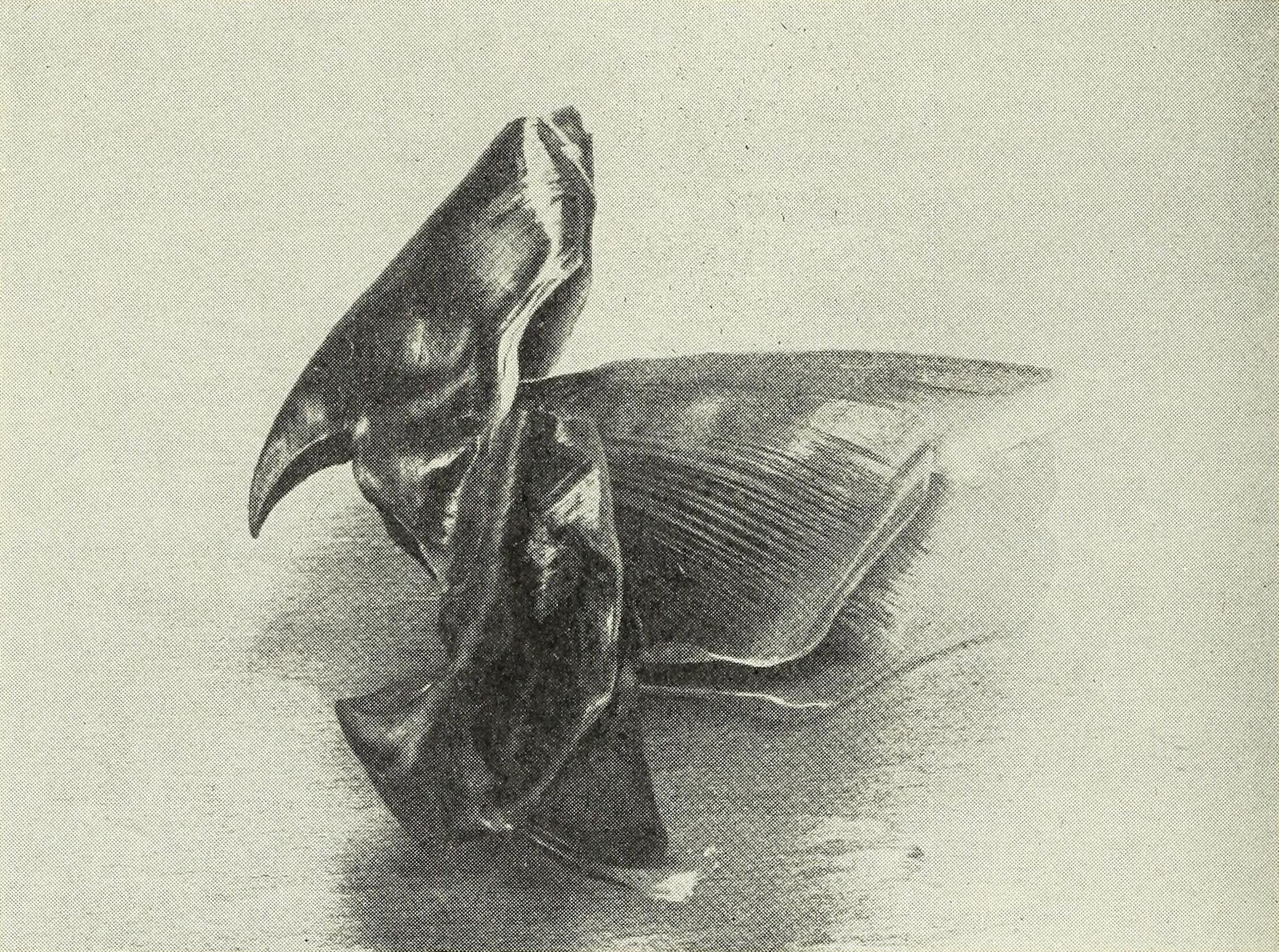
#113 (?/10/1938)
Beak of the giant squid found washed ashore near Ravenscar, England, in October 1938 (Clarke, 1939:136, fig.). The only part of the animal that was saved, it was secured by William James Clarke and forwarded by him to London's Natural History Museum.

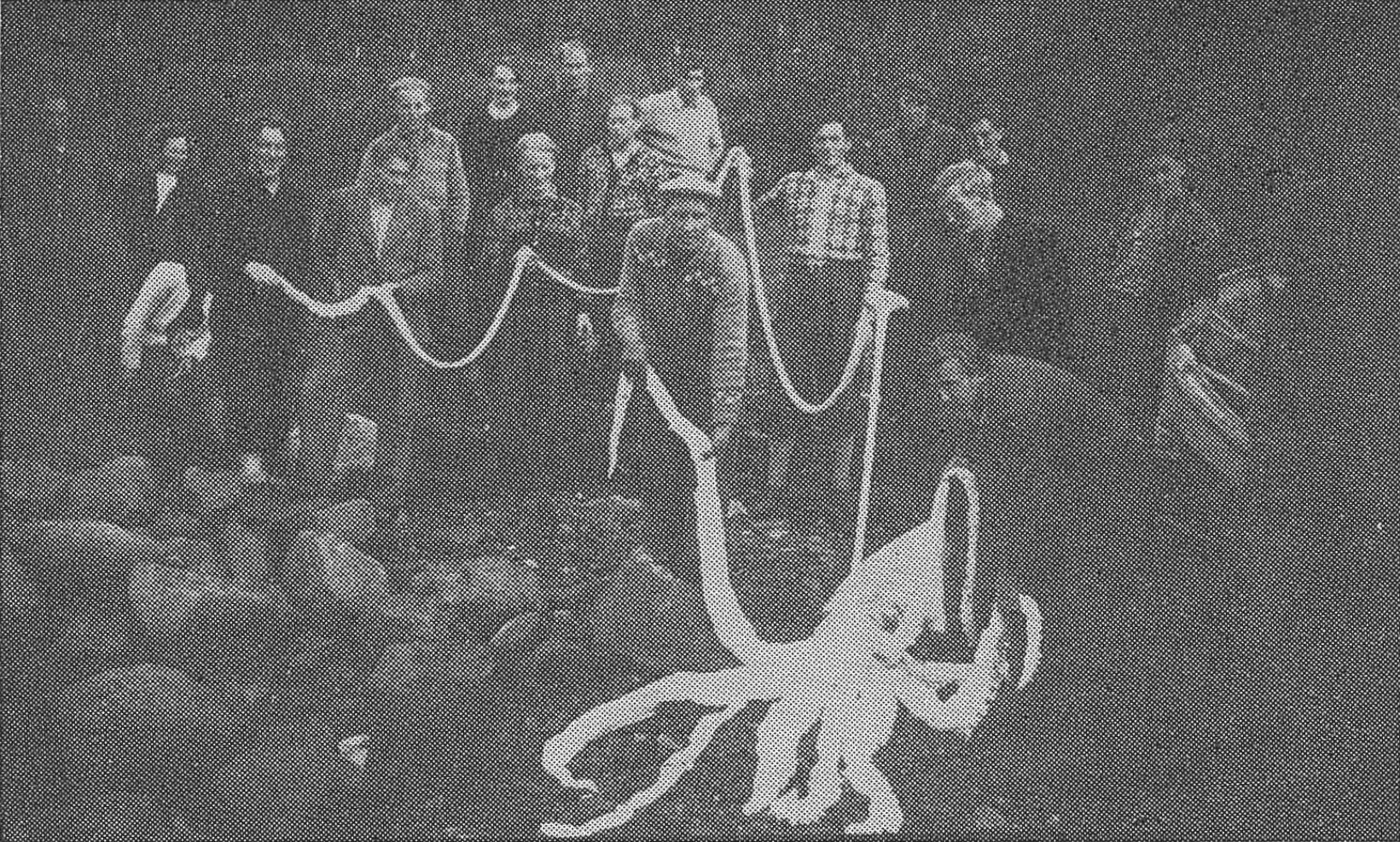
#119 (11/9/1946)
Giant squid that washed ashore in Romsdalsfjord, Romsdal, Norway, on 11 September 1946. It measured 9.35 m (30.7 ft) in total length and was described as being quite fresh and well-preserved.

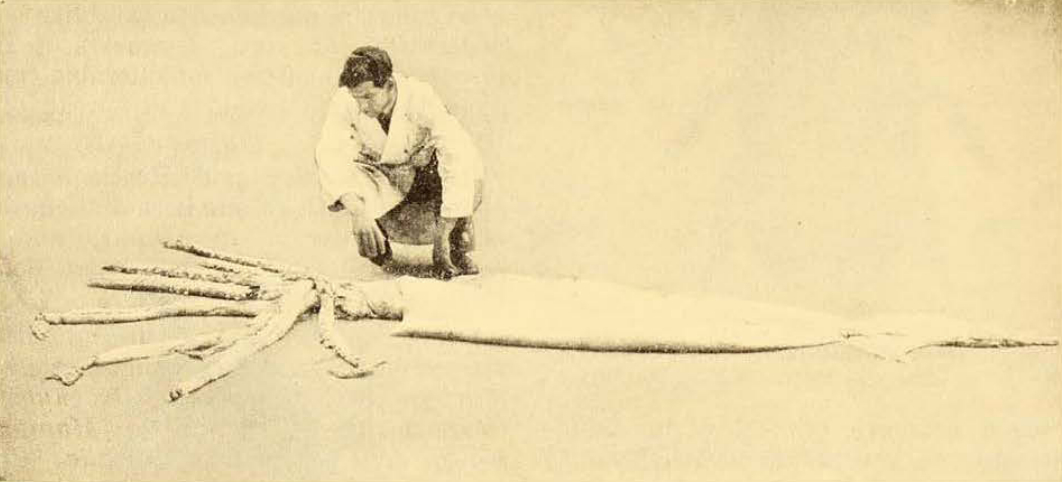
#121 (?/9/1948)
Giant squid that washed ashore in Wingan Inlet, Victoria, Australia, in September 1948 (Allan, 1948:306, fig.)

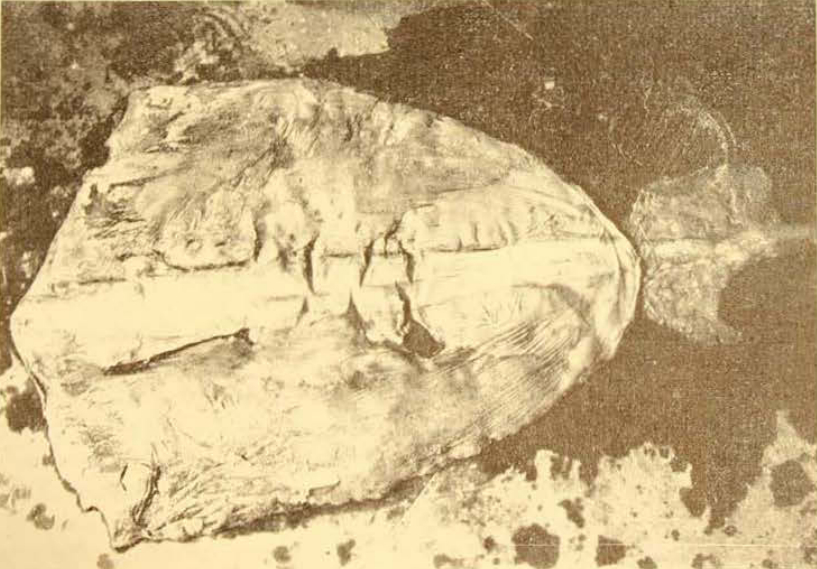
#121 (?/9/1948)
The same specimen with its mantle cut open, showing the central gladius (internal shell remnant) (Allan, 1948:307, fig.)

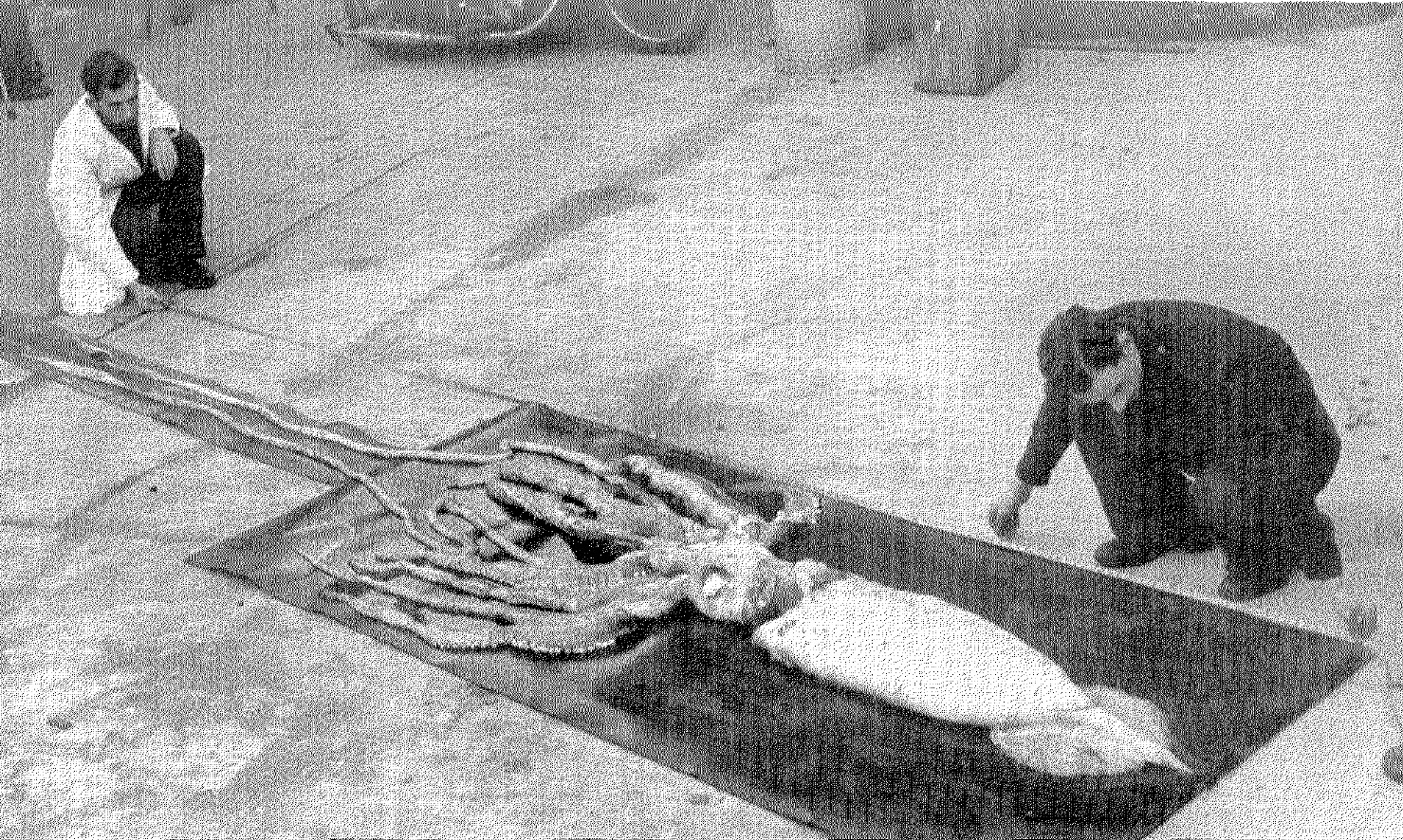
#124 (30/11/1949)
The specimen that was found stranded alive at the Bay of Nigg, Aberdeen, Scotland, on 30 November 1949, being examined at the Marine Laboratory, Aberdeen shortly after its discovery.

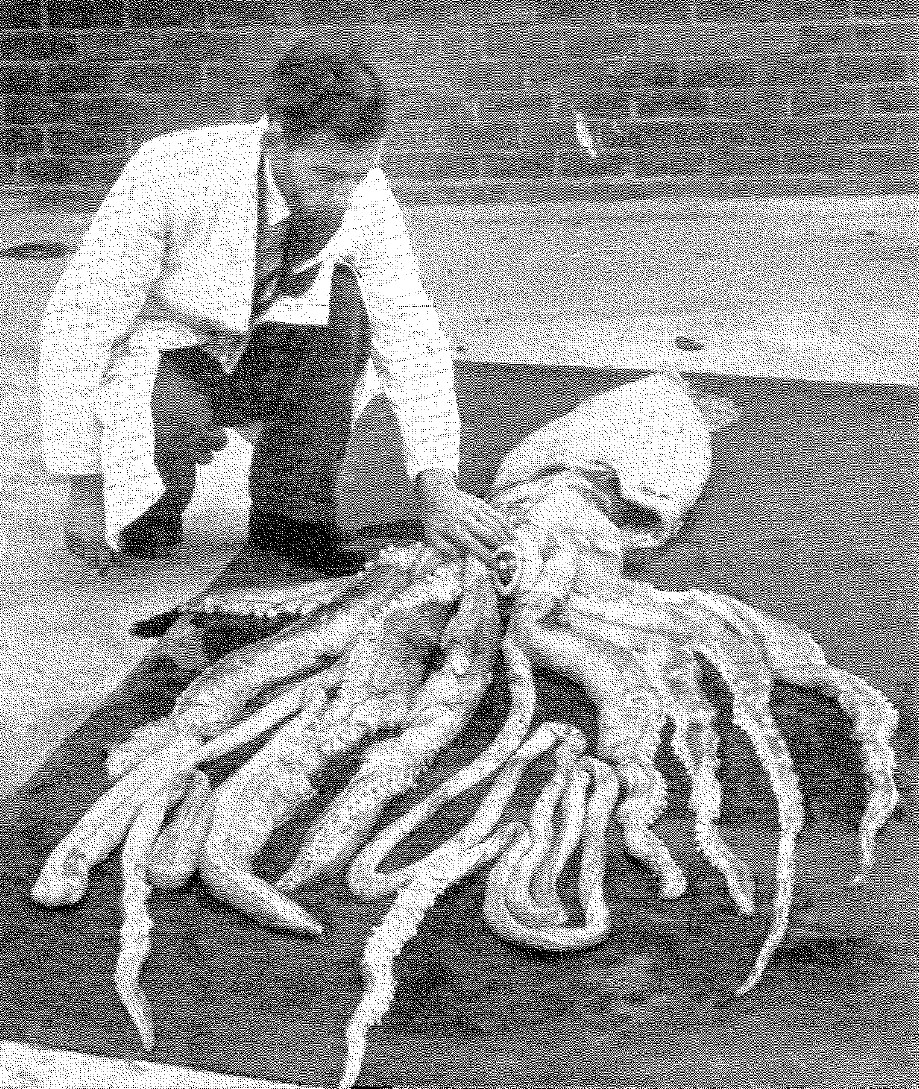
#124 (30/11/1949)
Another view of the same specimen; both this and the previous photograph were originally published in the Aberdeen Bon-Accord and Northern Pictorial and later reproduced in Rae (1950)

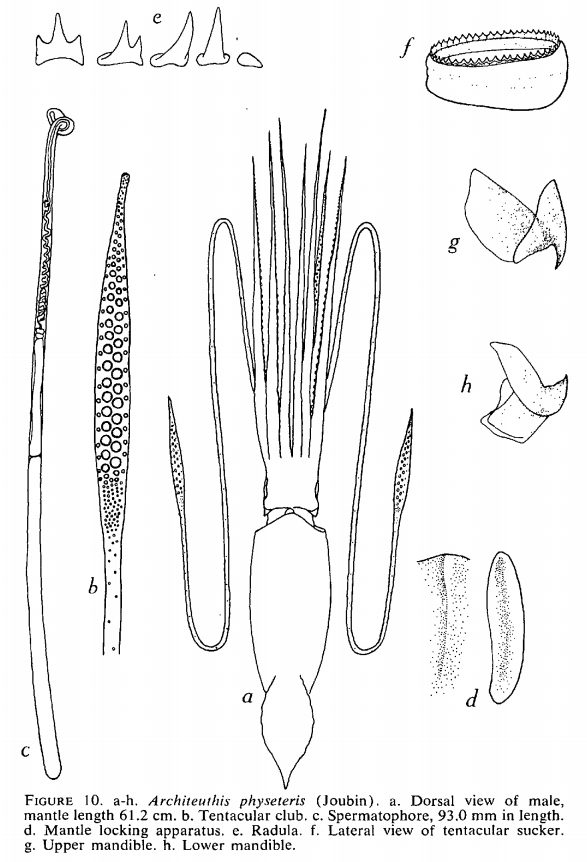
#131 (?/?/1954)
Semi-schematic illustration of the mature male giant squid found floating at the surface off the Mississippi Delta in 1954, from Gilbert L. Voss's comprehensive review of the cephalopods of the Gulf of Mexico (Voss, 1956:137, fig. 10)

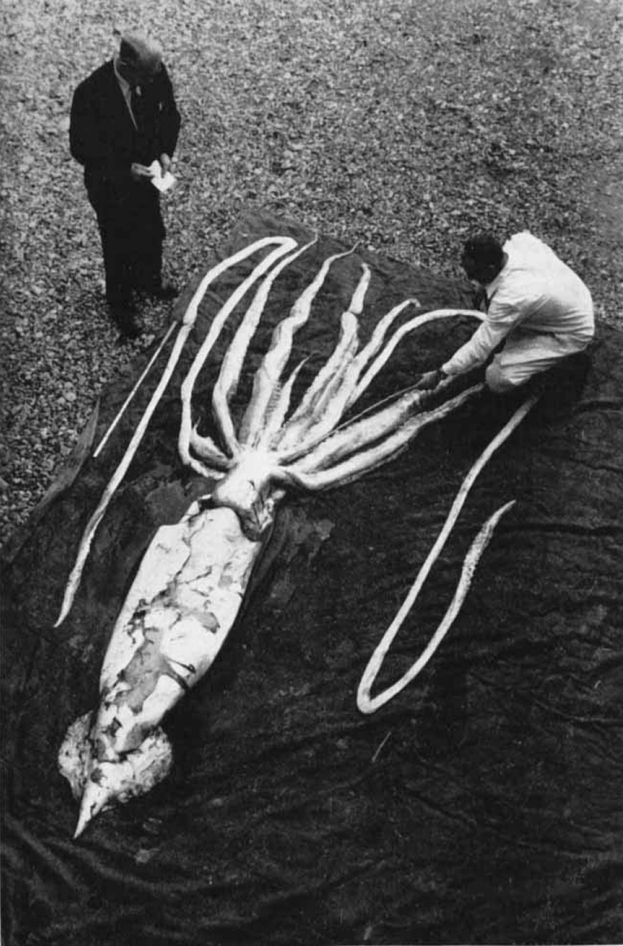
#136 (2/10/1954)
Giant squid measuring 9.24 m in total length that washed ashore at Ranheim in Trondheimsfjord, Norway, on 2 October 1954 (Clarke, 1966:103, fig. 4). There exists an alternate take of this much-reproduced composition.

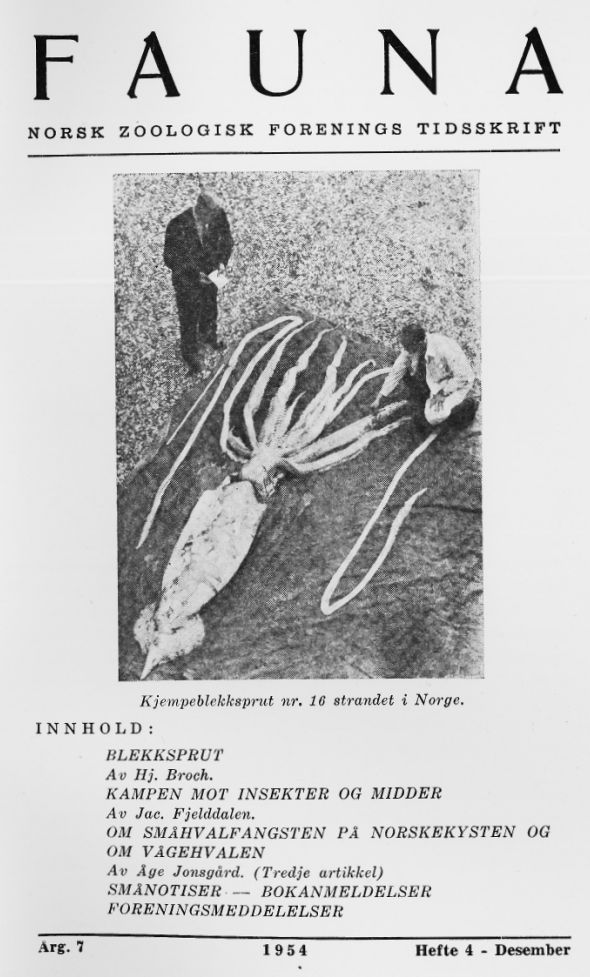
#136 (2/10/1954)
The specimen was featured on the cover of the December 1954 issue of the Norwegian Zoological Society's quarterly journal, Fauna: Norsk Zoologisk Forenings Tidsskrift

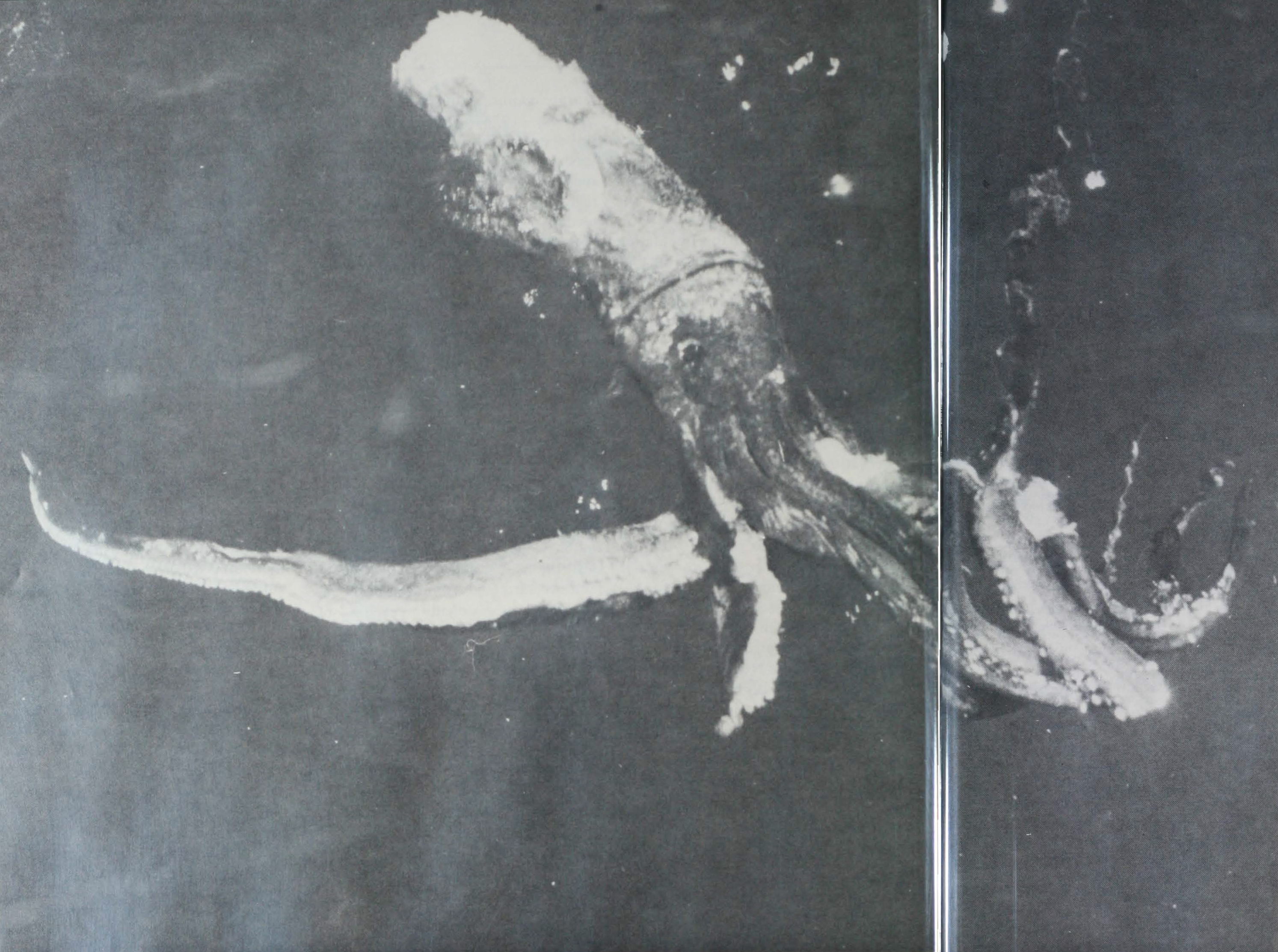
?#144 (?/?/1958)
Giant squid reportedly measuring around 47 ft (14 m) in total length, taken by the vessel Silver Bay off Florida, from a double-page spread in Rathjen (1973:24–25, fig. 7)

#148 (5/9/1960)
Complete specimen caught off Strömstad, Sweden, in 1960, likely by a shrimp trawler. Exhibited at the Swedish Museum of Natural History in Stockholm, October 2026 (see also overview of display, information board, and detail of tentacular club)

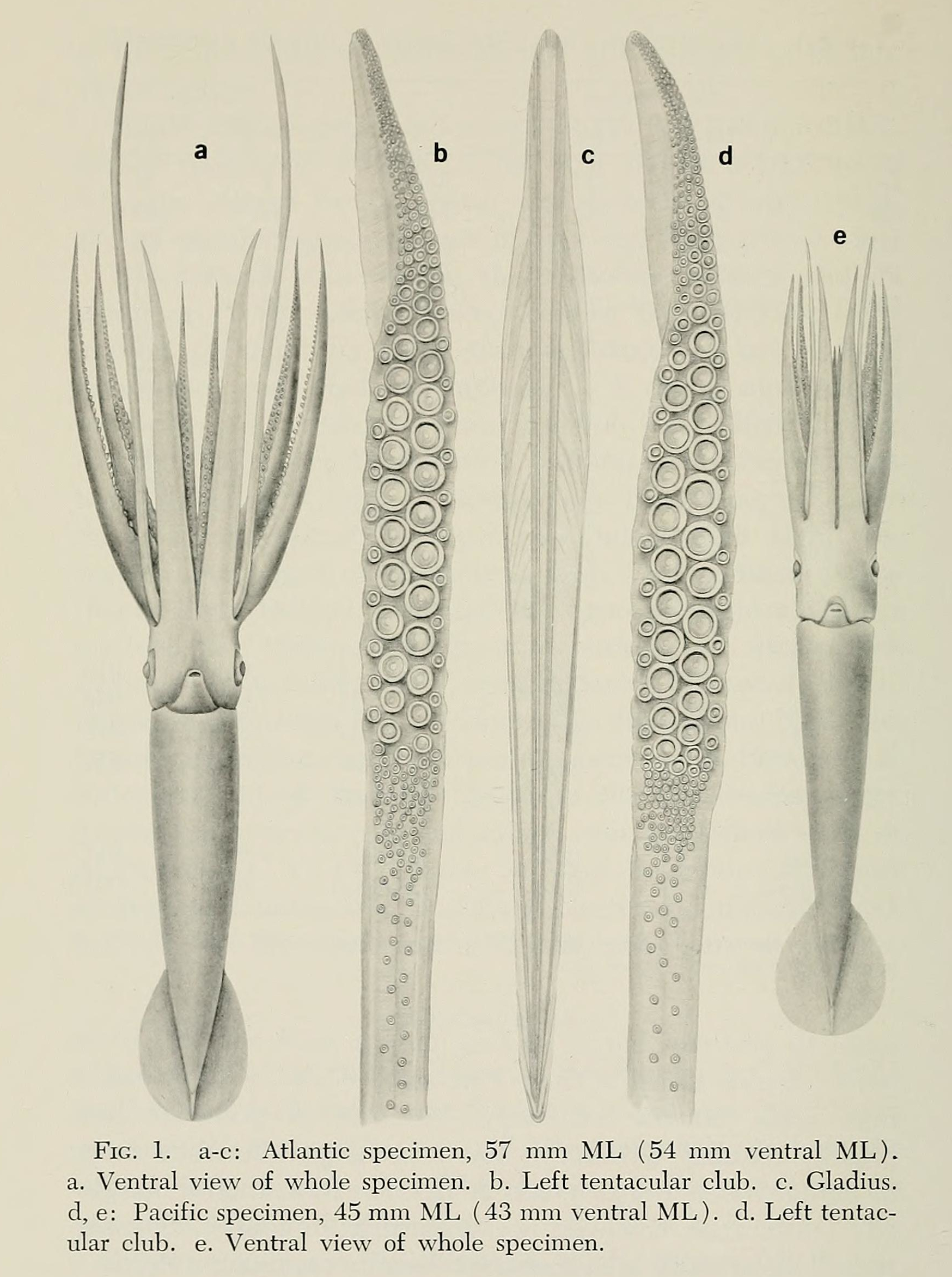
#149 (18/2/1961) and #164 (17/12/1963)
The first early juvenile giant squid specimens ever recorded, both taken from lancetfish stomachs: the left from the northeast Atlantic (57 mm ML; #149) and the right from the southeast Pacific (45 mm ML; #164); details of their tentacular clubs and the gladius of the Atlantic specimen are also shown (Roper & Young, 1972:208, fig. 1)

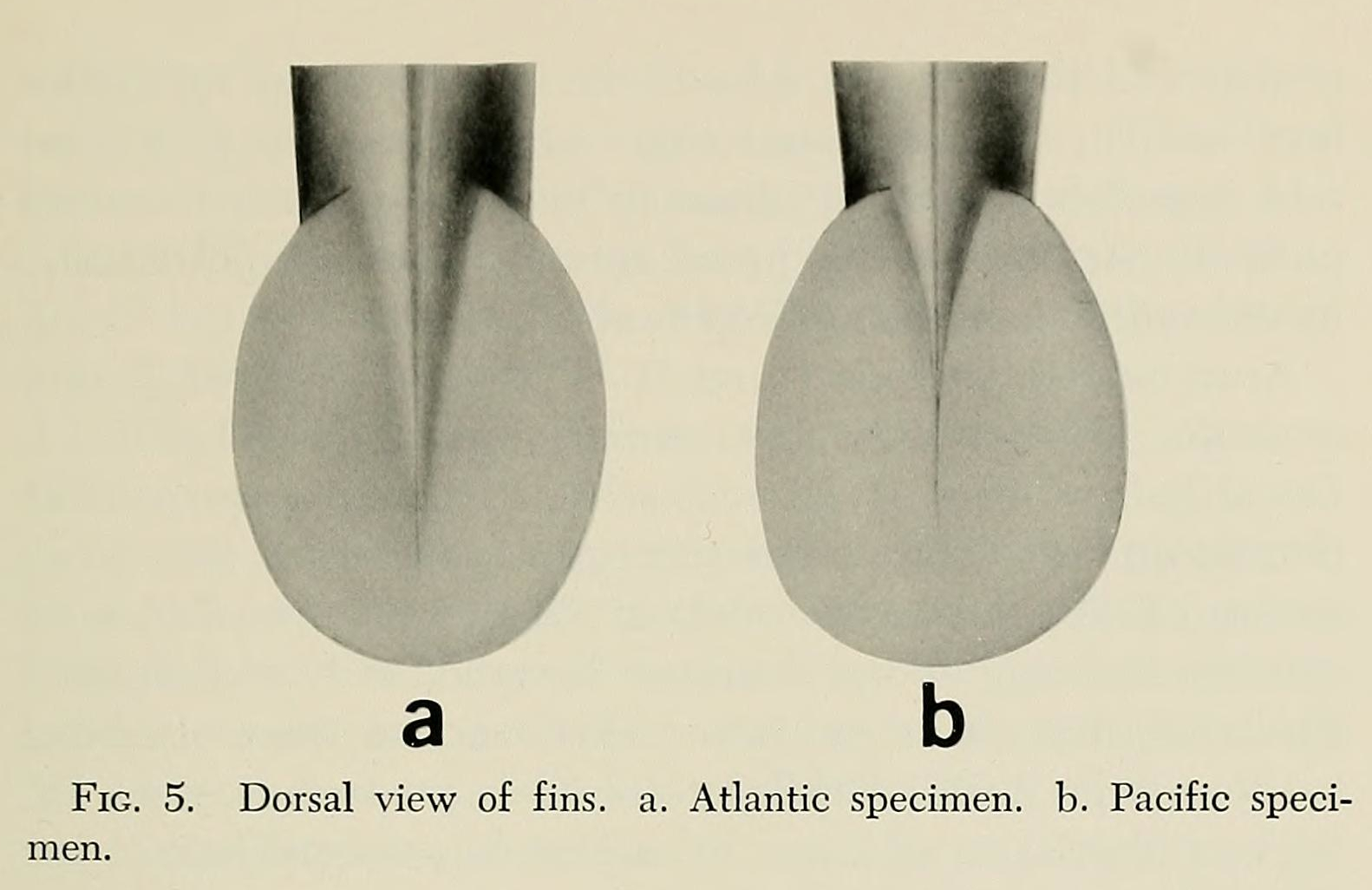
#149 (18/2/1961) and #164 (17/12/1963)
Dorsal view of the fins of the same two juvenile giant squid specimens (Roper & Young, 1972:213, fig. 5)

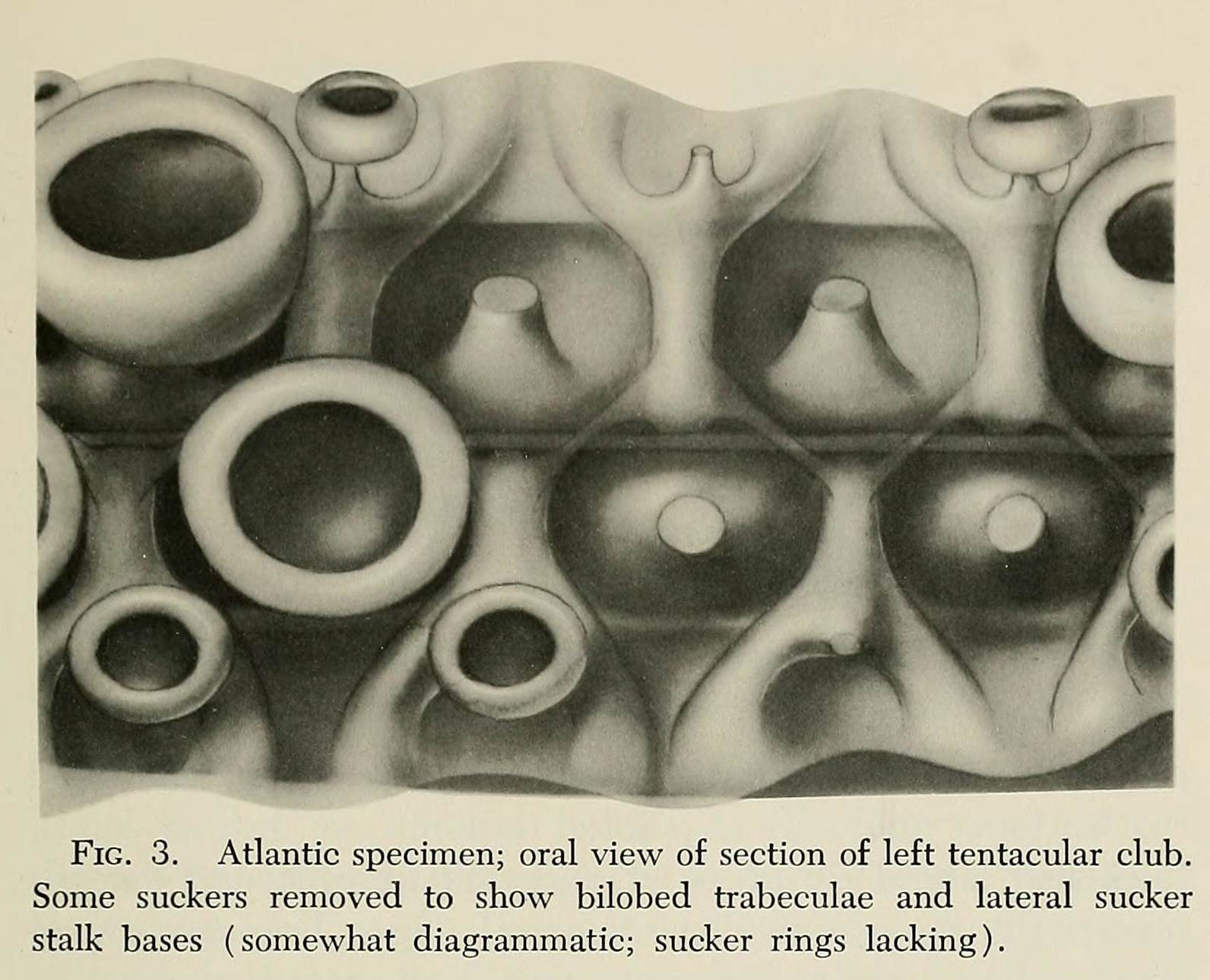
#149 (18/2/1961)
Semi-diagrammatic oral view of the left tentacular club of the Atlantic juvenile with some suckers removed to show underlying details (Roper & Young, 1972:211, fig. 3)

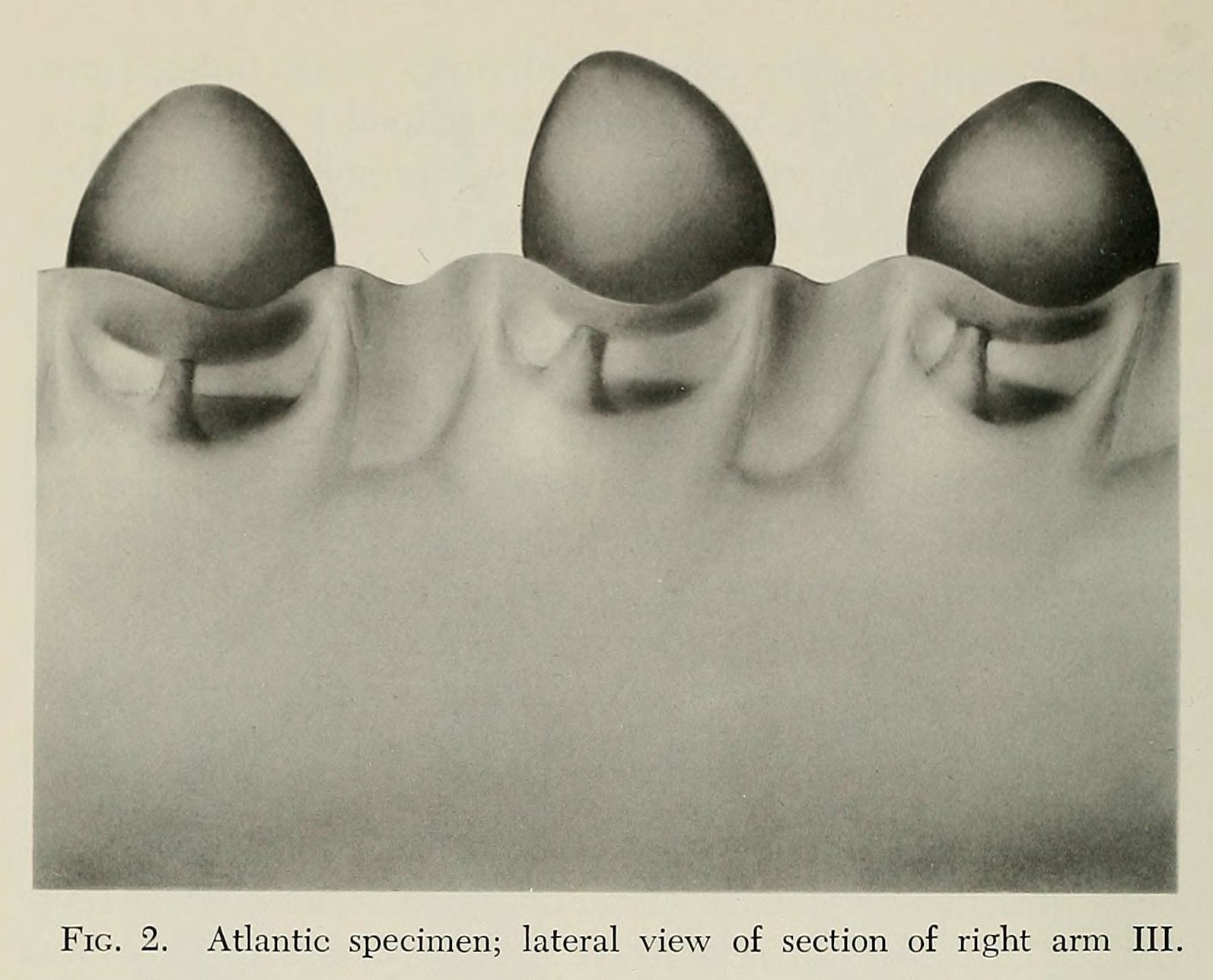
#149 (18/2/1961)
Lateral detail of arm III of the Atlantic juvenile (Roper & Young, 1972:210, fig. 2)

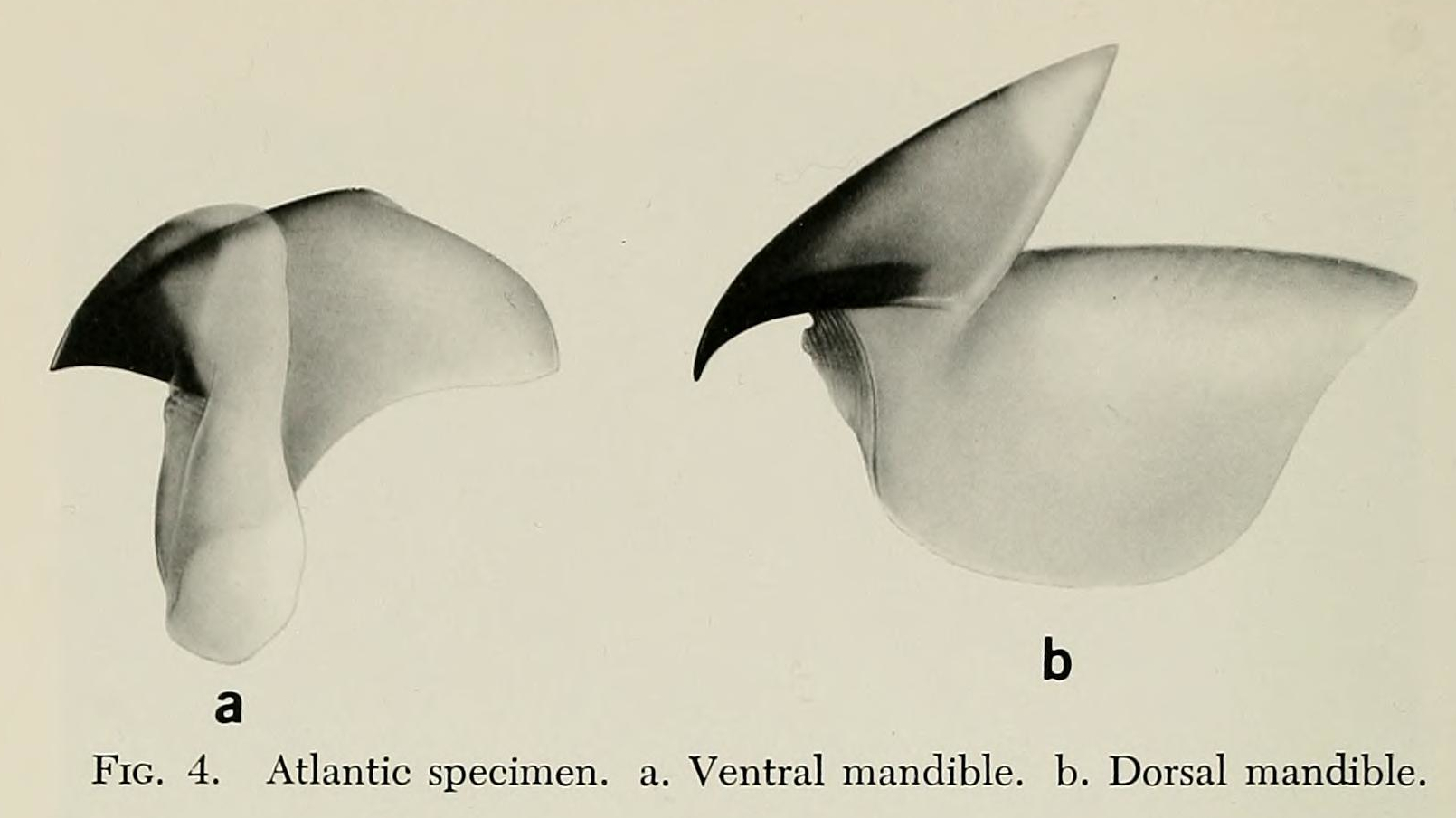
#149 (18/2/1961)
Lower (left) and upper beaks of the Atlantic juvenile (Roper & Young, 1972:212, fig. 4)

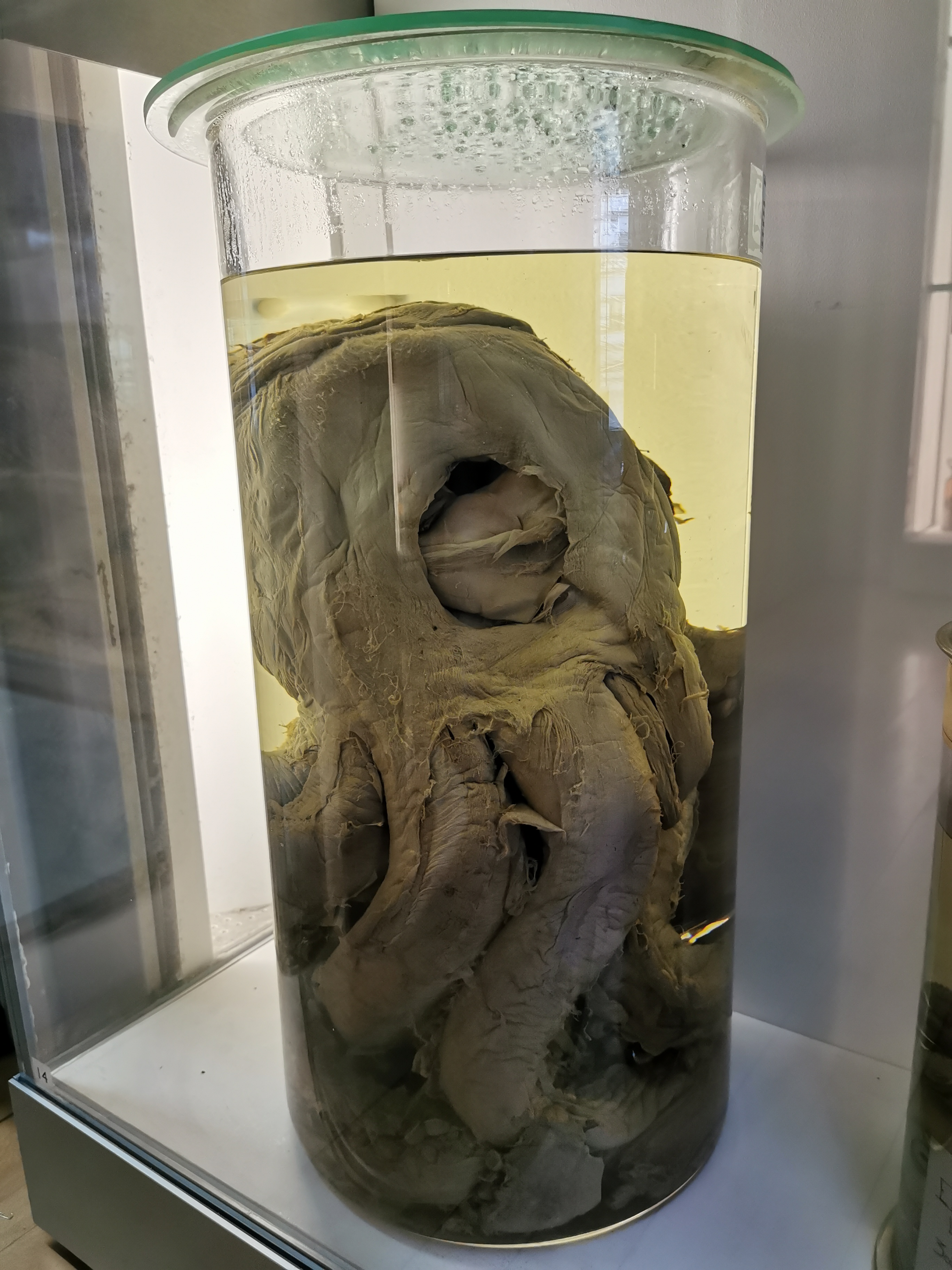
(?/?/1962)
Partially digested head of a giant squid recovered from a sperm whale stomach in Durban, South Africa, in 1962; identified by Malcolm Clarke (see label). On display at the London Natural History Museum's Darwin Centre.

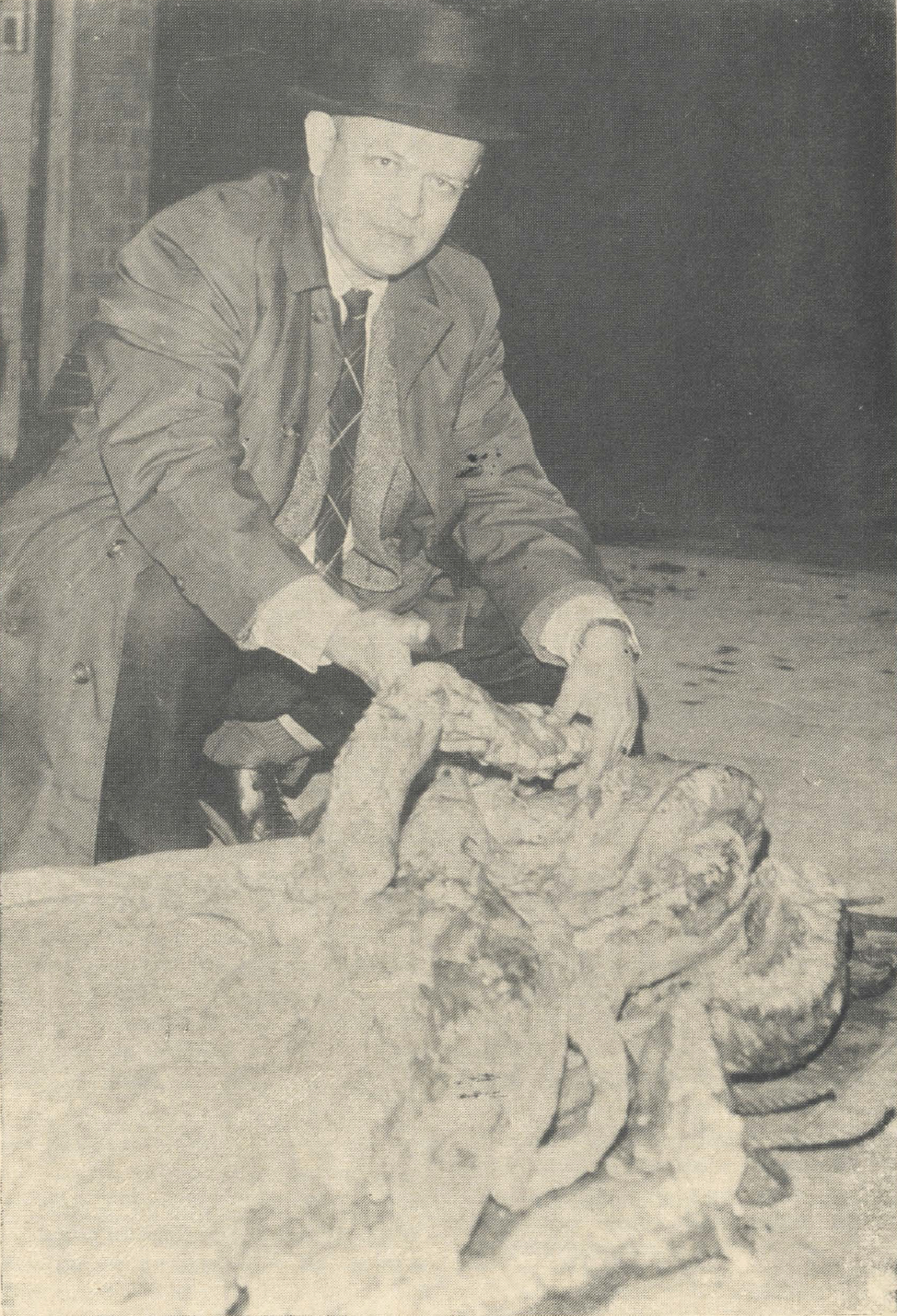
#169 (23/10/1964)
Frederick Aldrich with the giant squid found floating at the surface off Conche, White Bay, Newfoundland, in October 1964 (Aldrich & Brown, 1967:4, fig.)

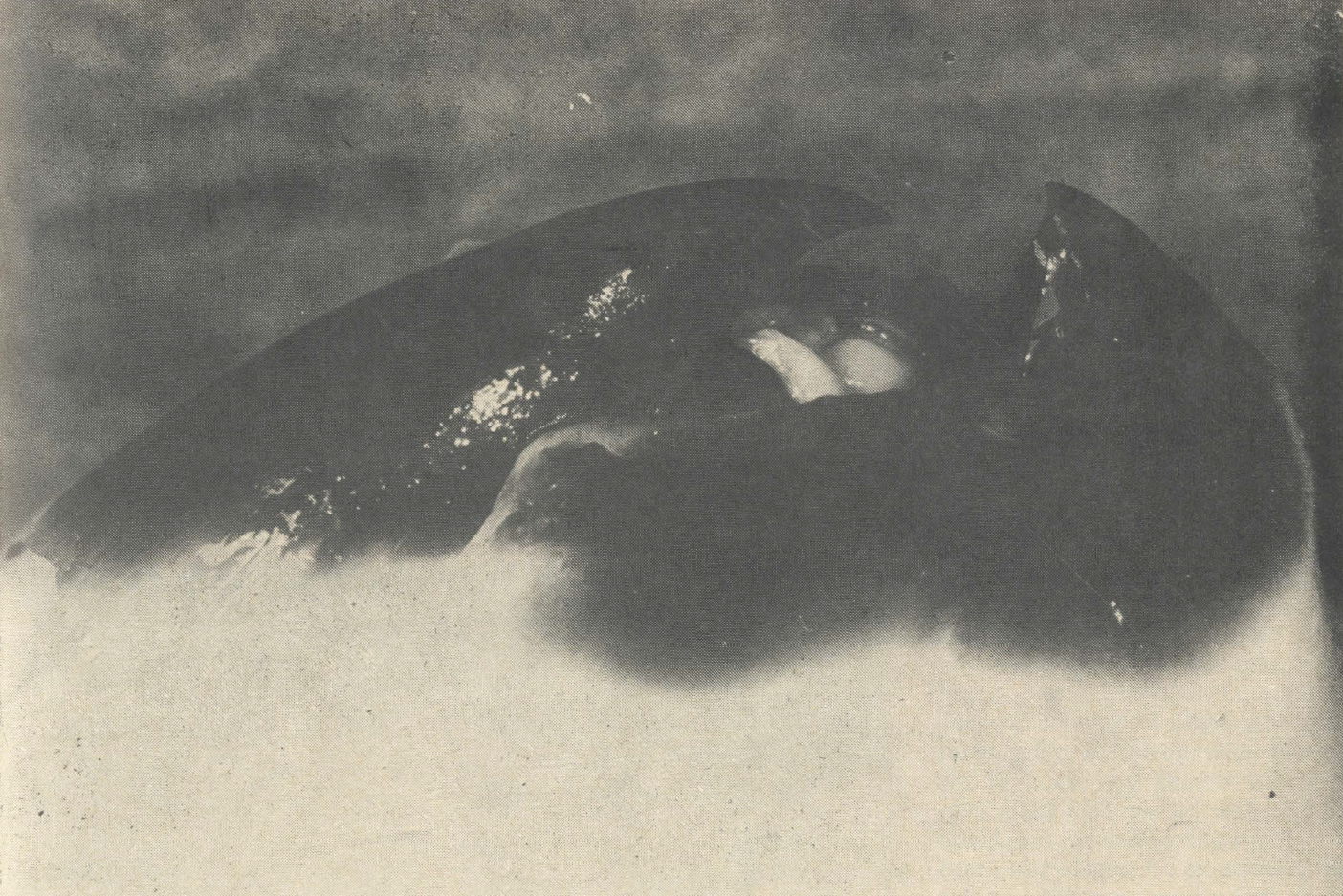
#169 (23/10/1964)
Beak of the White Bay giant squid (Aldrich & Brown, 1967:7, fig.)

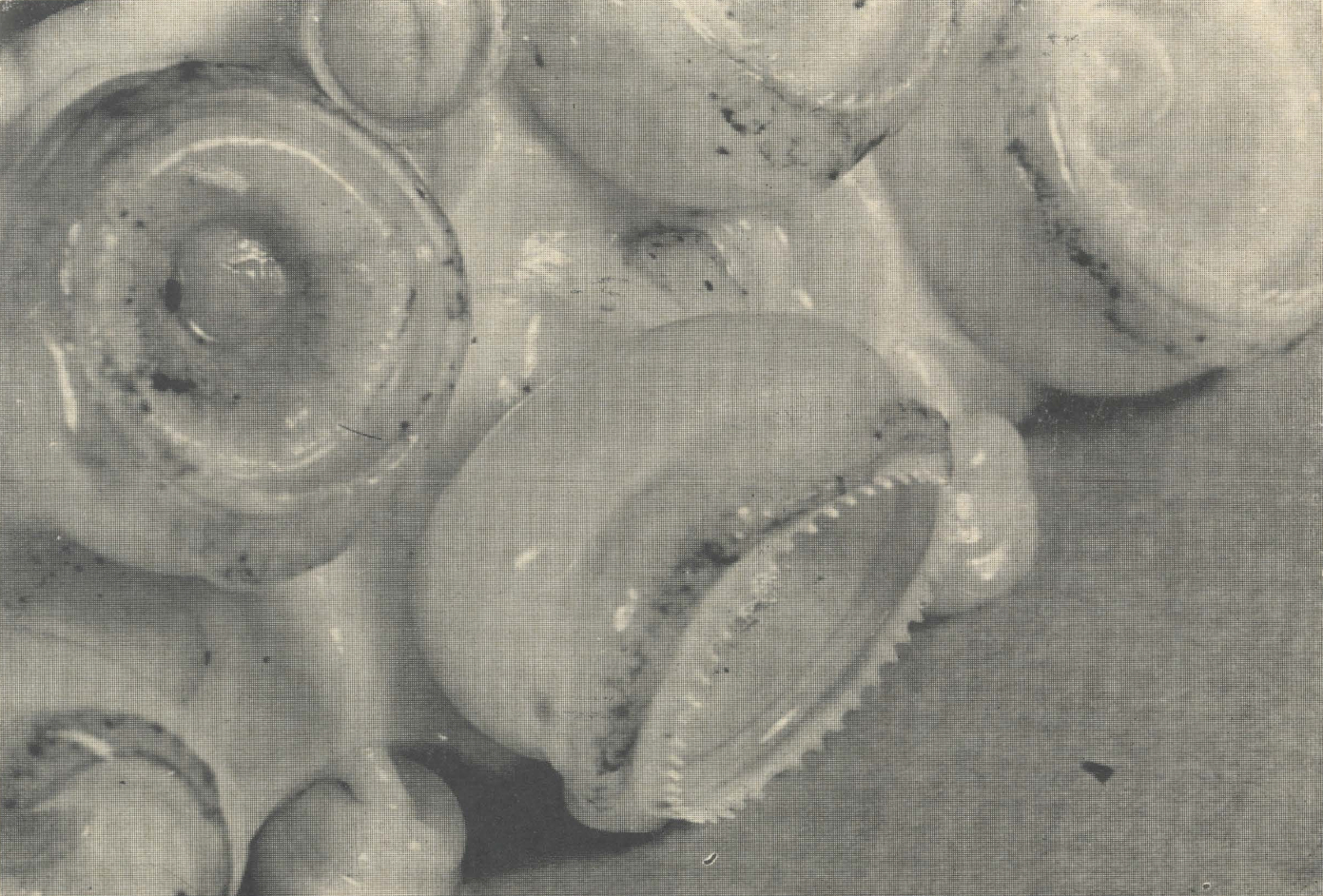
#169 (23/10/1964)
Tentacular suckers of the White Bay giant squid (Aldrich & Brown, 1967:7, fig.)

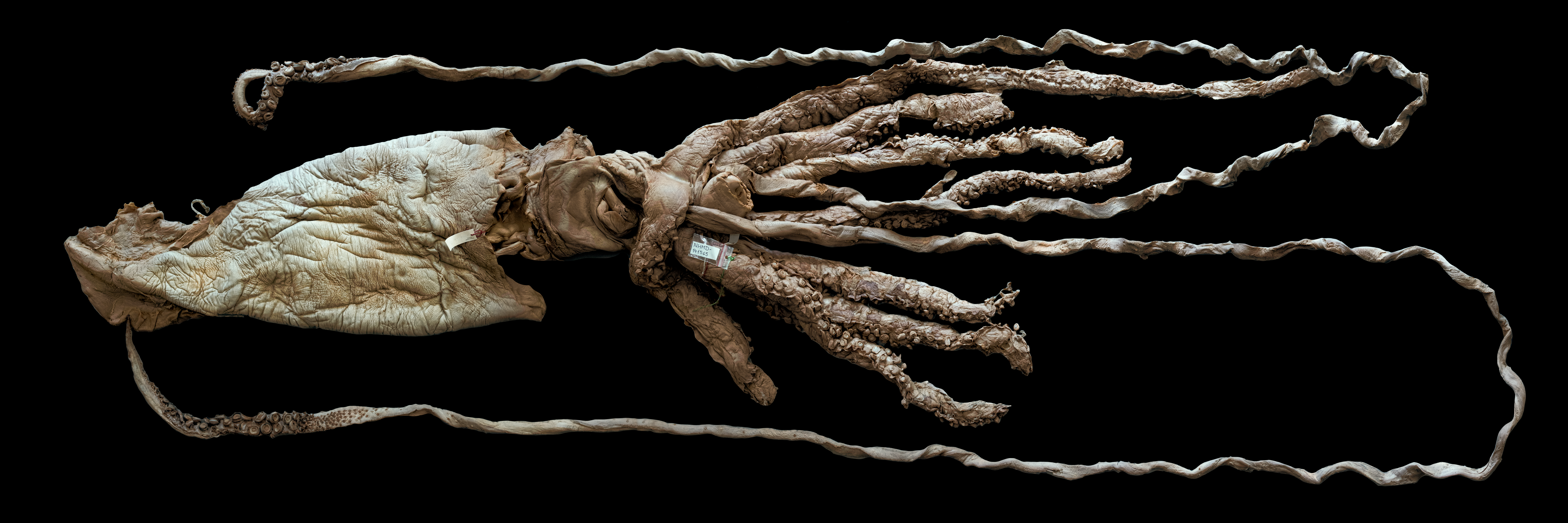
#172 (25?/3/1965)
Near-complete specimen collected from Skagen, Denmark, on 23 or 25 March 1965. Shown as it appeared in 2021, preserved at the Natural History Museum of Denmark in Copenhagen.

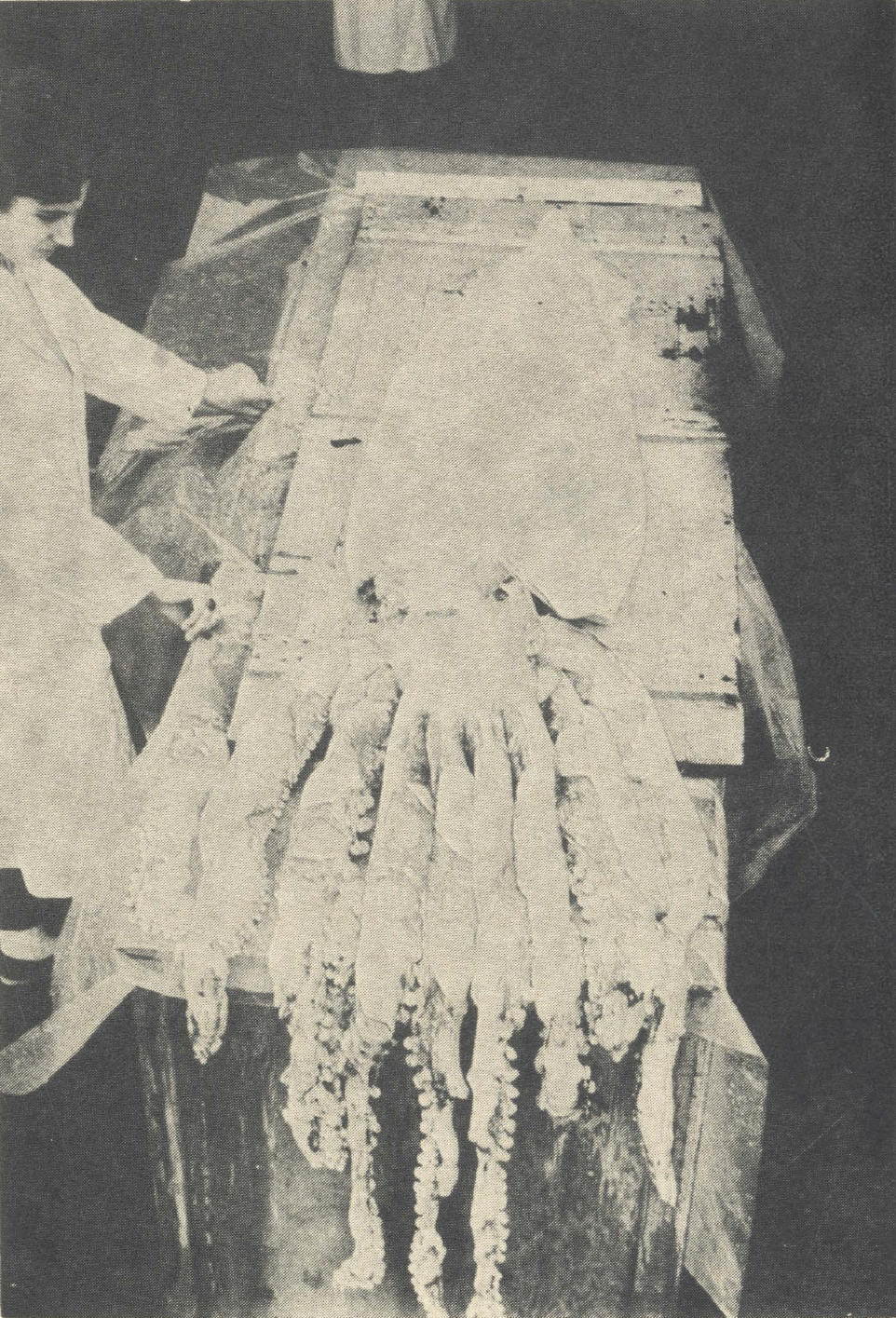
#178 (9/11/1966)
Giant squid specimen from Sweet Bay, Bonavista Bay, Newfoundland, November 1966 (Aldrich & Brown, 1967:8, fig.)

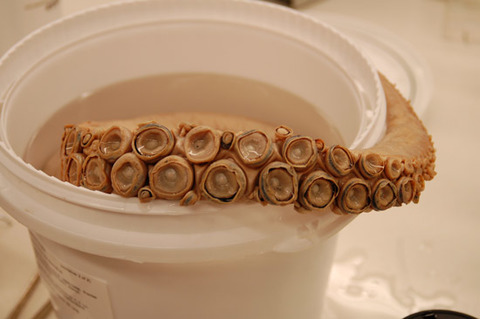
Specimen from Newfoundland acquired by Yale's Peabody Museum of Natural History in 1979 from the Memorial University of Newfoundland (YPM IZ 017964). Measurements taken from this specimen were used in the preparation of the life-sized giant squid model that currently hangs above the main entrance of the Peabody museum.

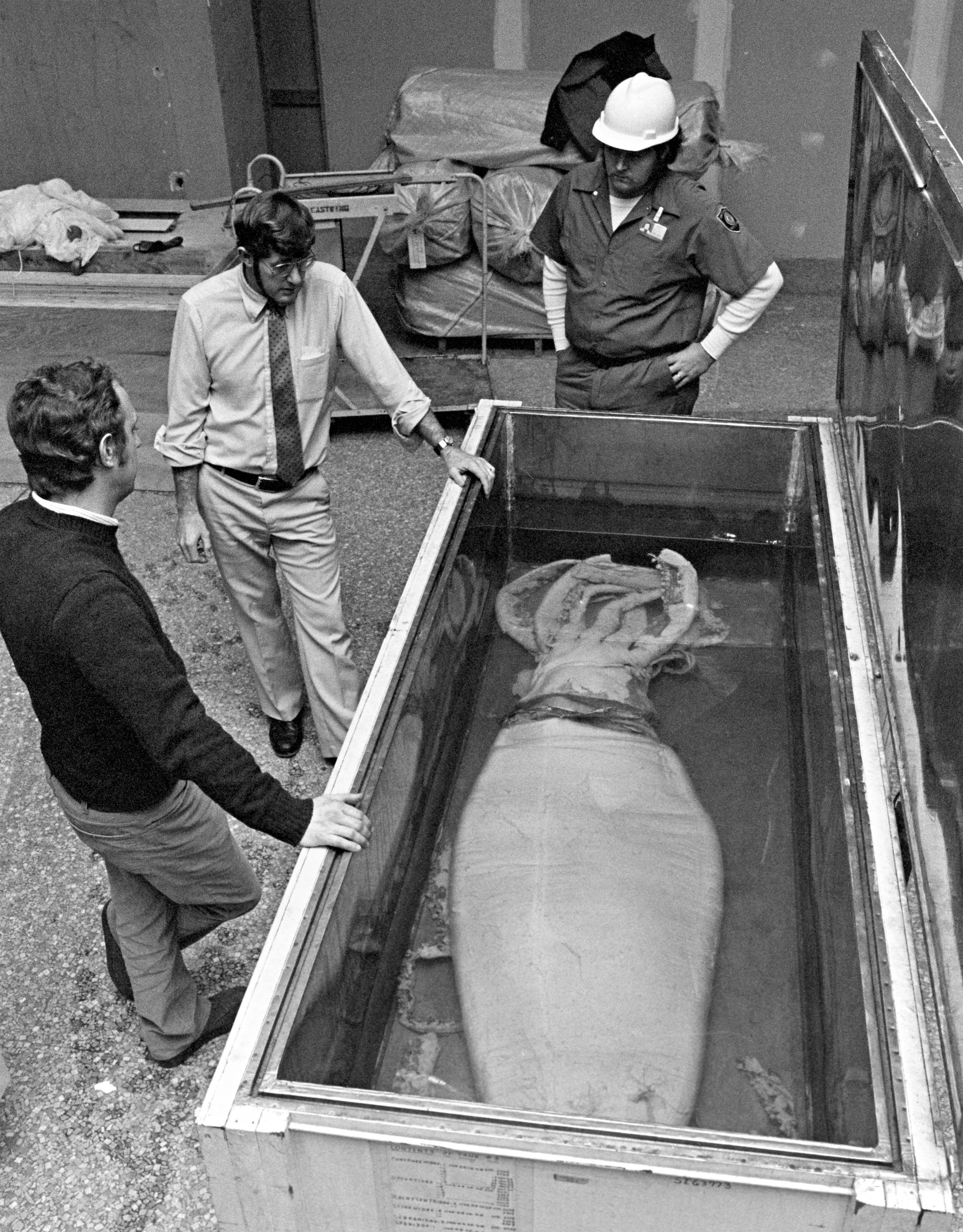
#240 (?/2/1980)
Michael J. Sweeney (left) and Clyde F. E. Roper (center) with the giant squid that washed ashore on Plum Island, Massachusetts, in early February 1980, as it was being prepared for display at the National Museum of Natural History in 1983.

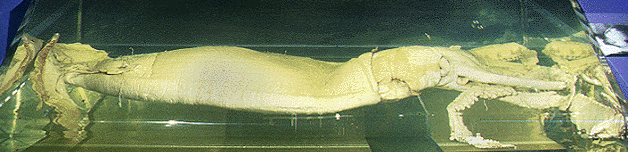
#240 (?/2/1980)
The Plum Island specimen as it appeared when exhibited at the National Museum of Natural History in Washington, D.C.

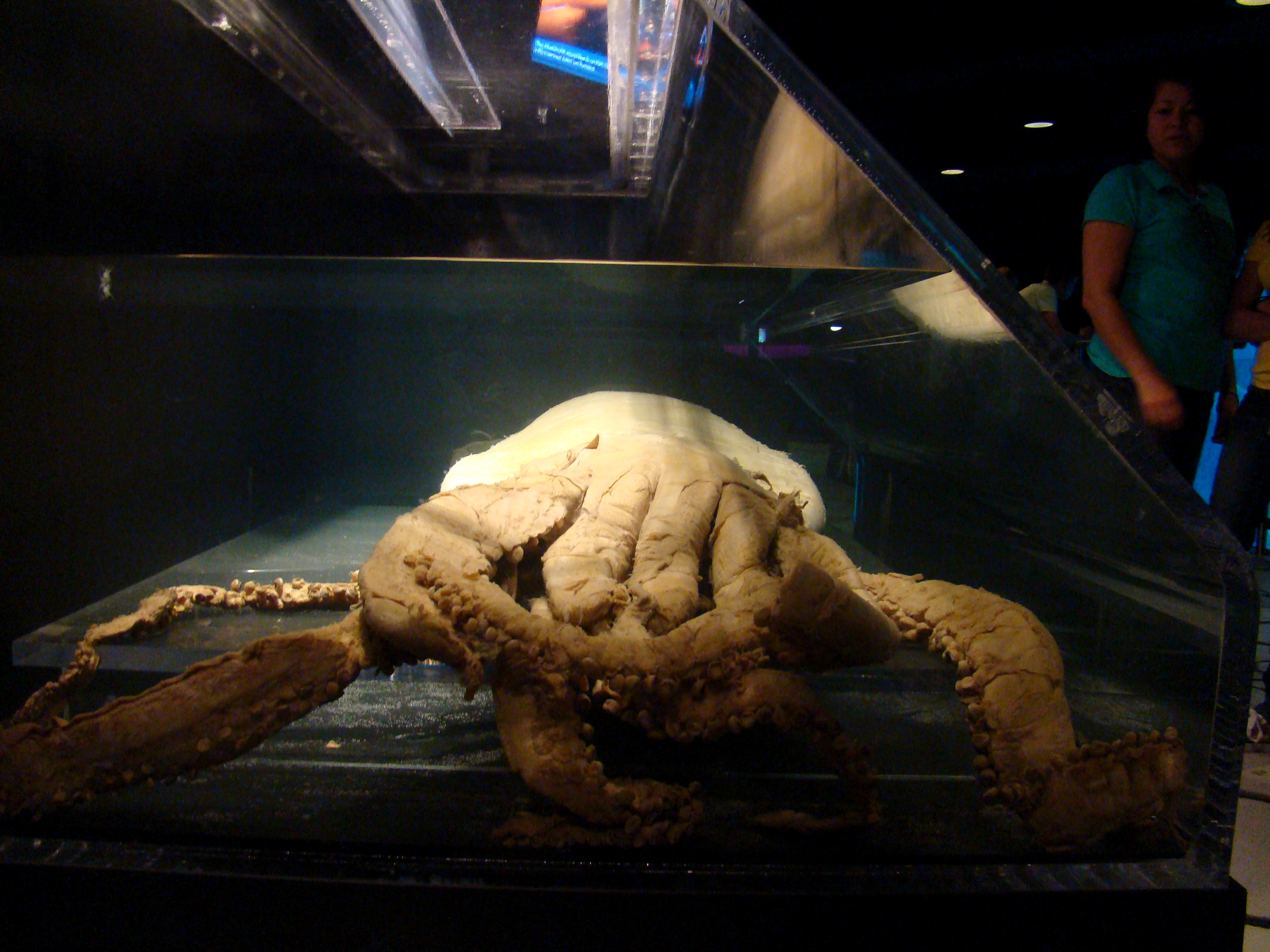
#240 (?/2/1980)
Since 2009, the Plum Island specimen has been on loan to the Georgia Aquarium in Atlanta, where it is on display in the Cold Water Quest Gallery

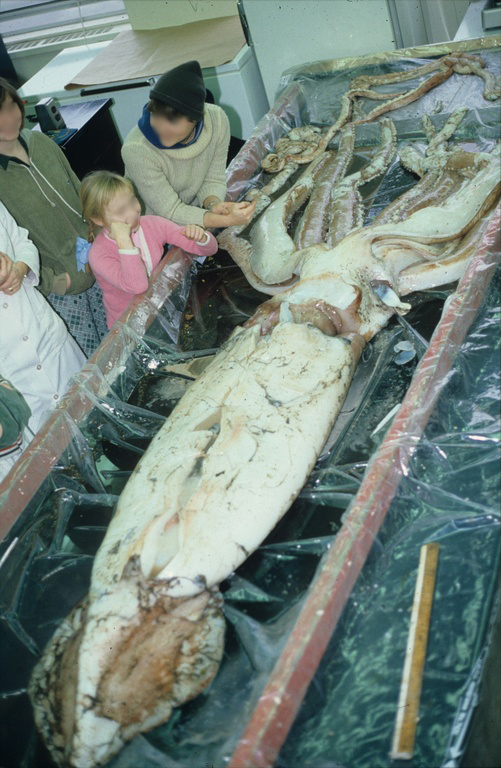
#254 (10/11/1981)
Giant squid during dissection at the Memorial University of Newfoundland. This specimen was recovered in Bonavista North, Newfoundland.

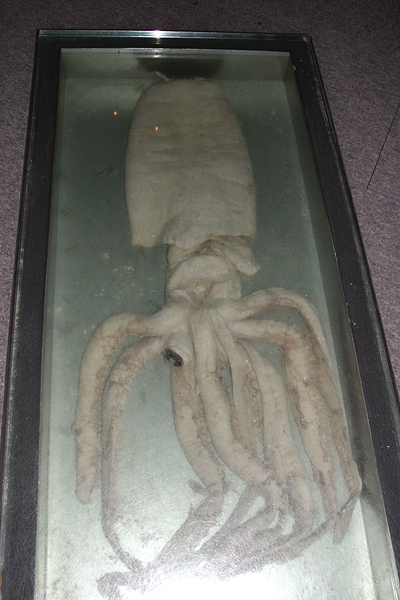
#260 (?/9/1982)
Giant squid at the Naturalis Biodiversity Center in Leiden, the Netherlands

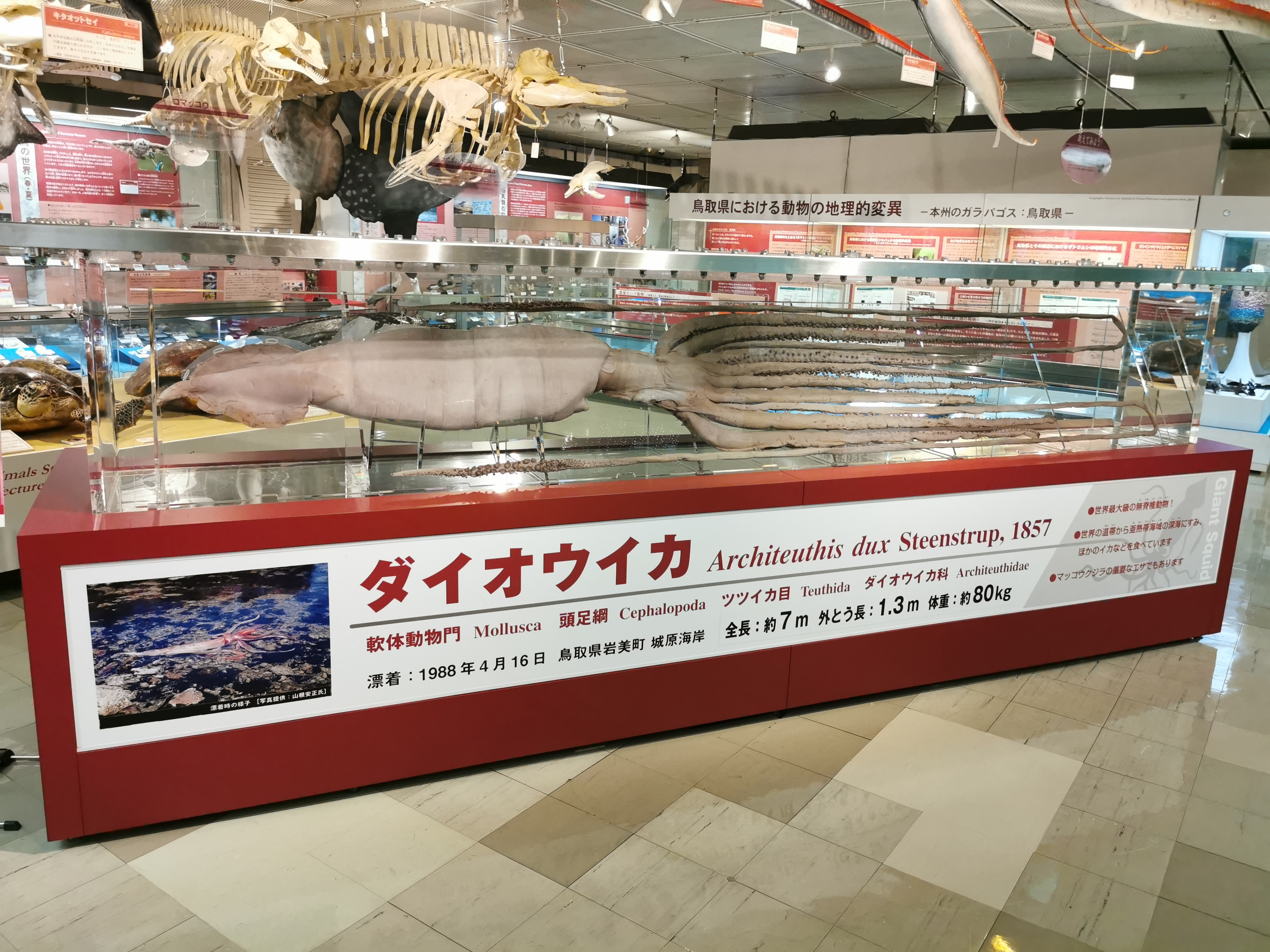
#323 (16/4/1988)
Giant squid found stranded in shallow water on the Uradome coast of Tottori Prefecture, Japan, on 16 April 1988. The oldest publicly exhibited Architeuthis specimen in Japan, it is on display at Tottori Prefectural Museum preserved in formalin.

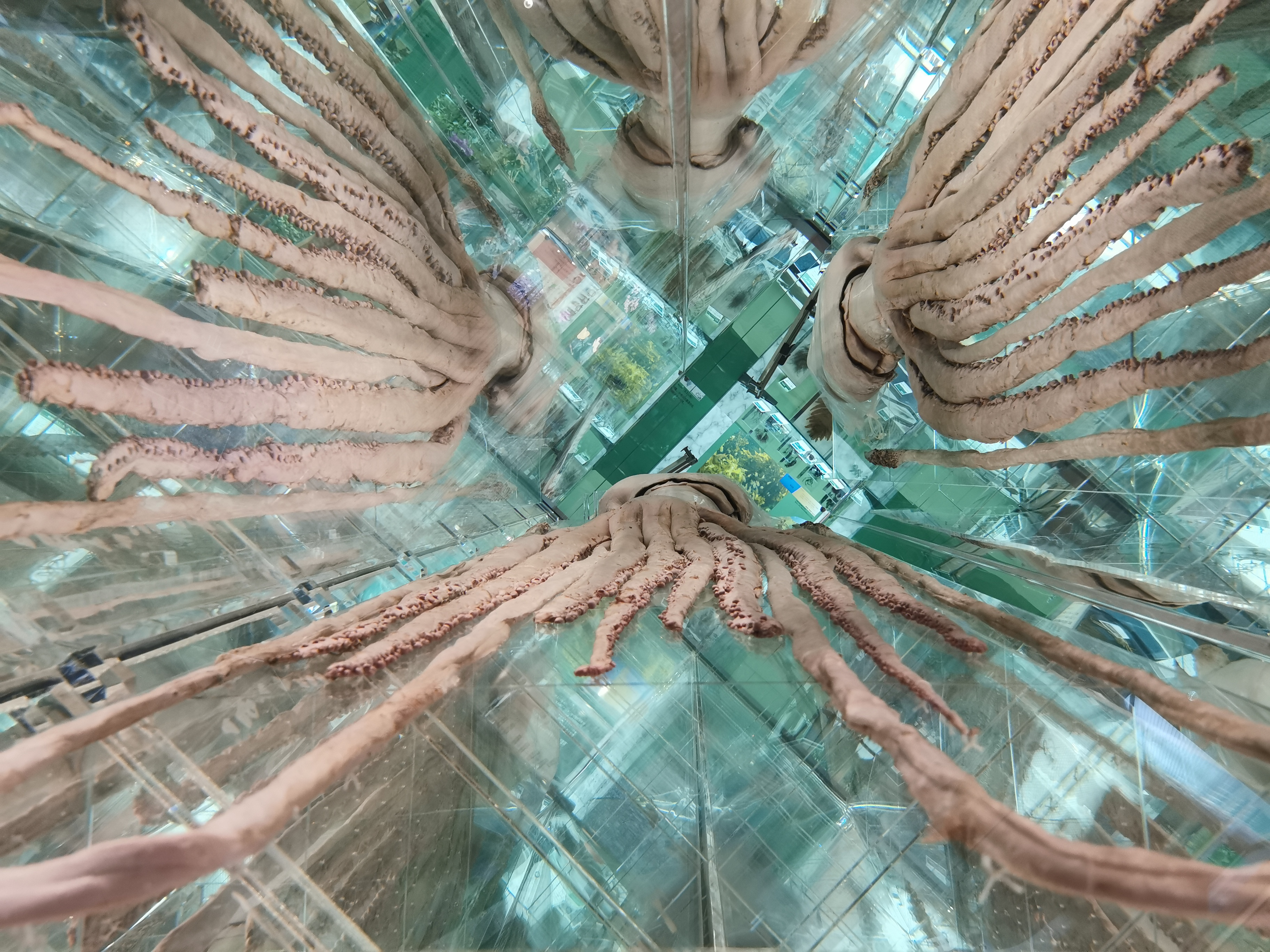
#323 (16/4/1988)
Oral view of the 1988 specimen exhibited at Tottori Prefectural Museum (see also ventral view showing sewn-up mantle, and closeups of mantle, limbs, and medial suckers of tentacular club)

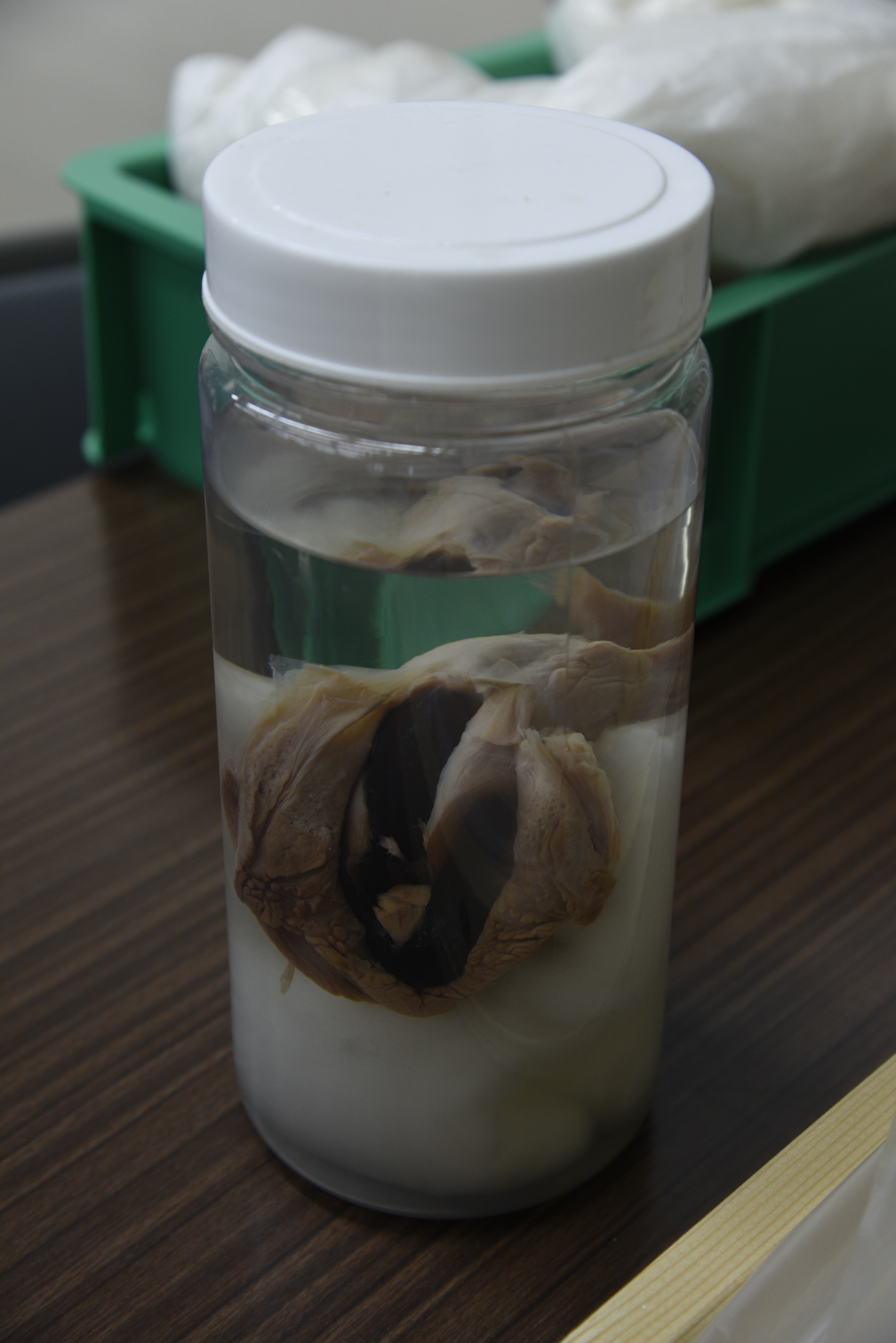
#323 (16/4/1988)
Separately preserved mouthparts of the 1988 specimen (not on public display)

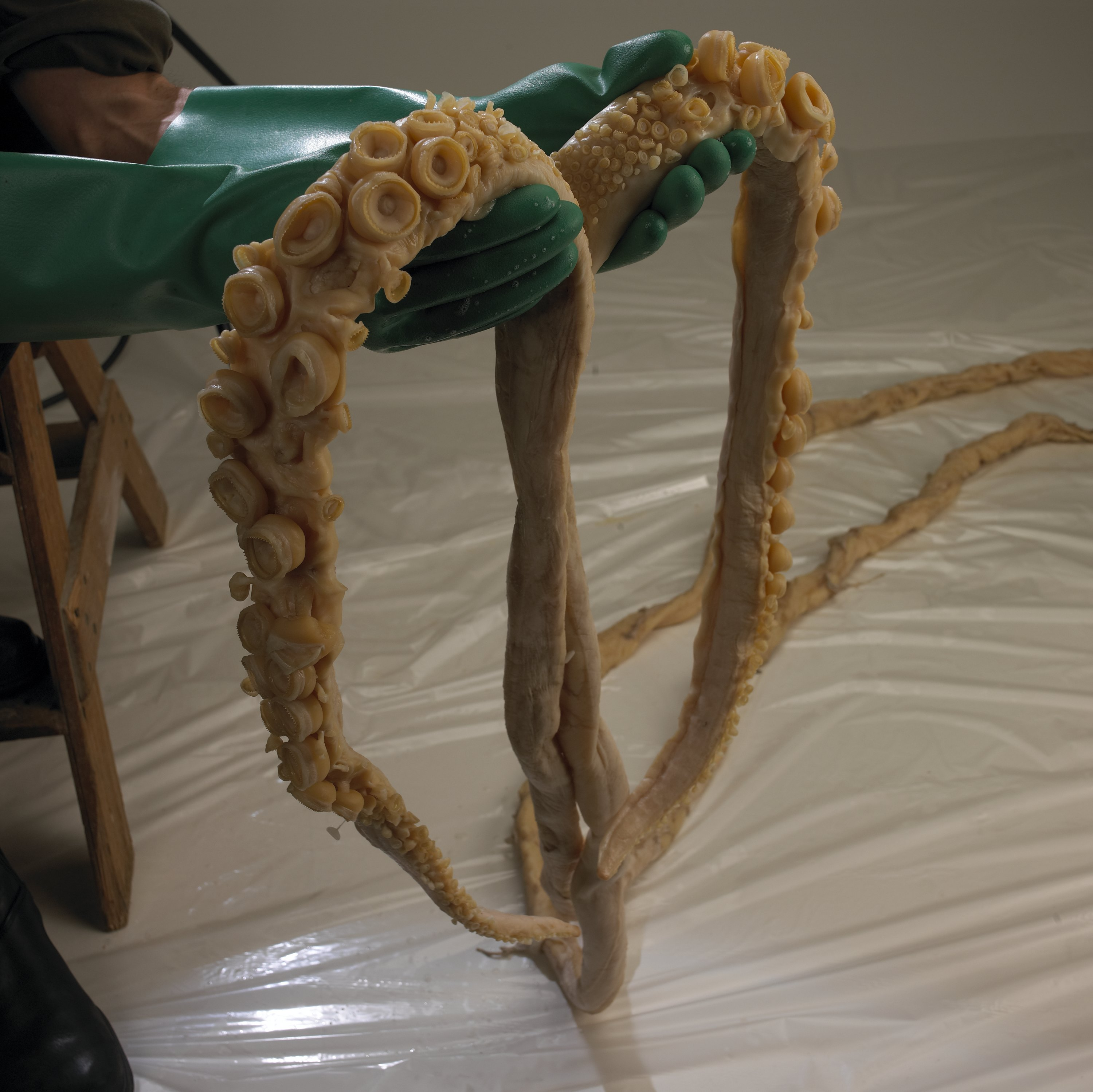
#341 (16/7/1992)
Tentacles of the giant squid found washed ashore near Eaglehawk Neck, Tasmania, on 16 July 1992, now held in the collections of Museums Victoria

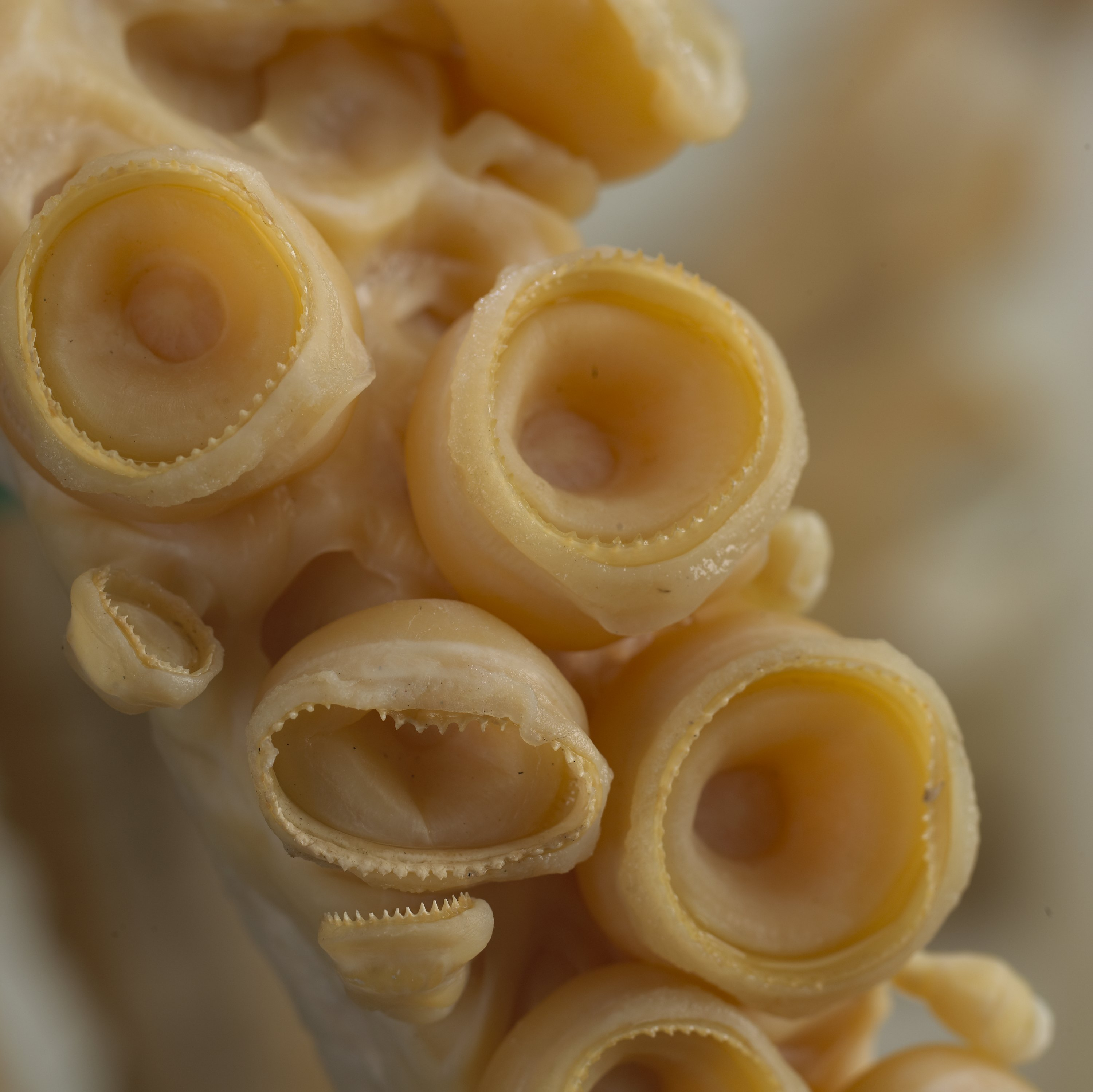
#341 (16/7/1992)
Closeup of the tentacular suckers of the same specimen

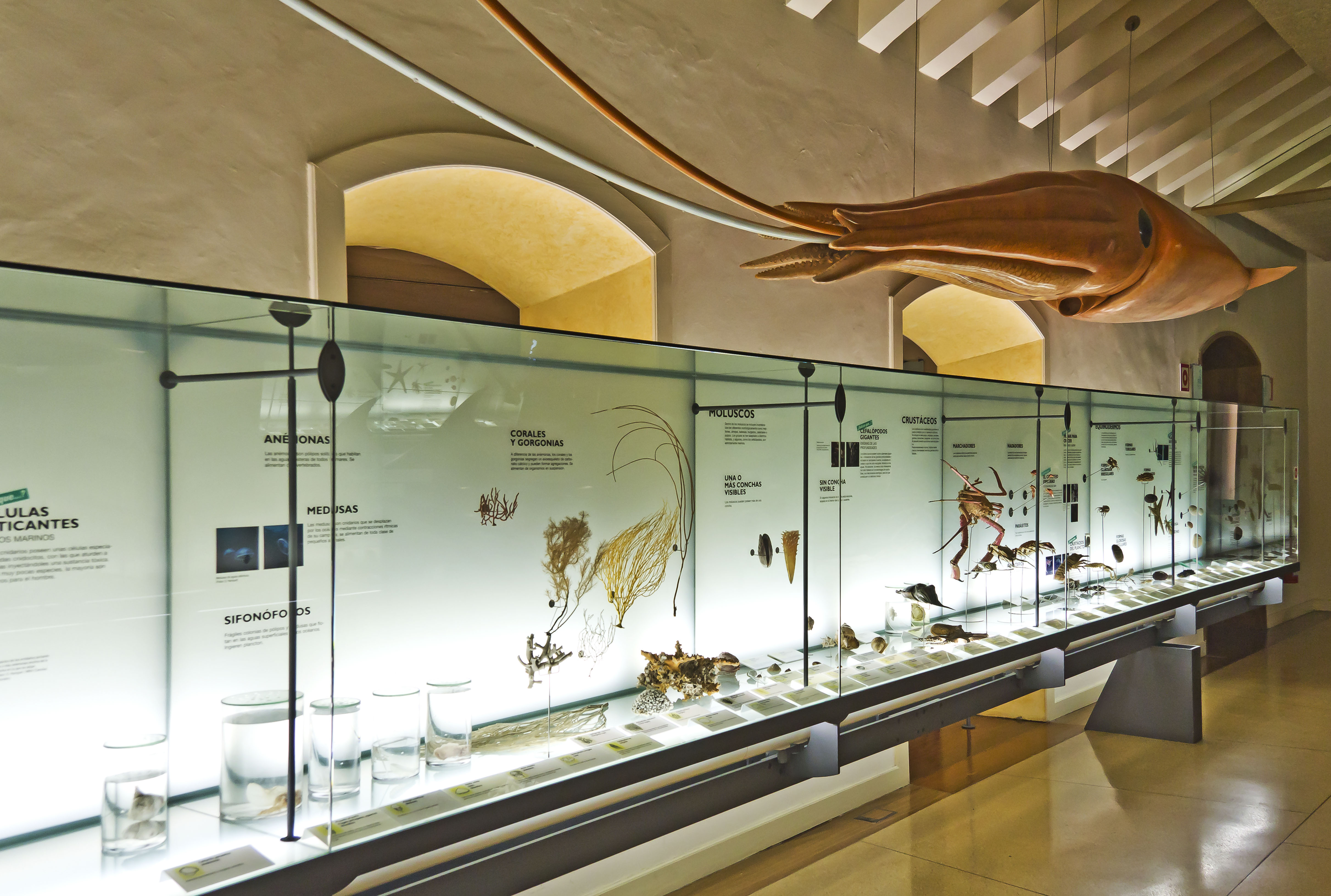
#345 (?/3/1994)
Giant squid model on display at Museo de la Naturaleza y Arqueología in Santa Cruz de Tenerife, Tenerife, based on a specimen found floating at the surface off Los Cristianos, Tenerife, in March 1994 (see also view from other side)

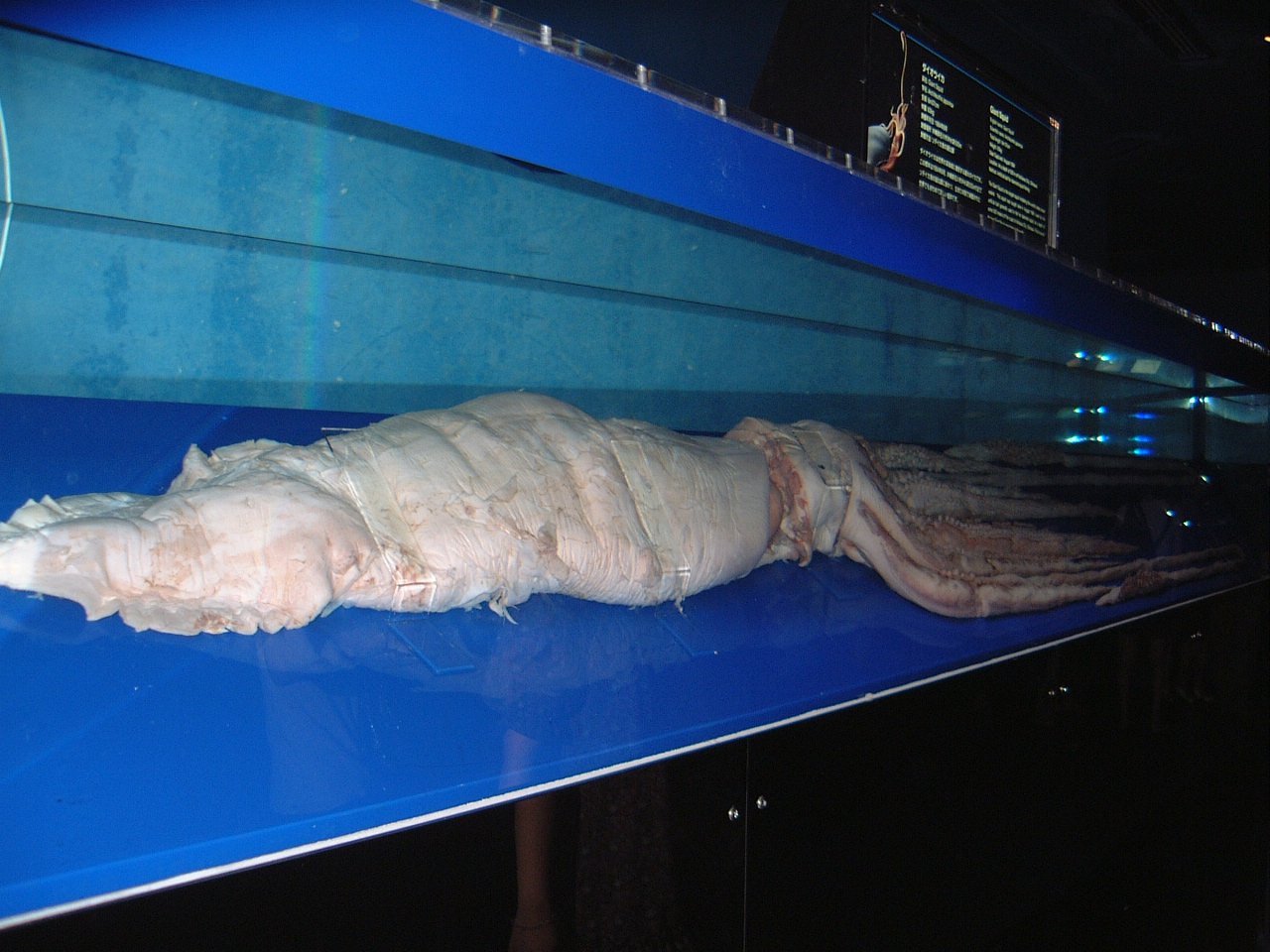
#349 (?/8/1994)
Specimen exhibited at Okinawa Churaumi Aquarium, Japan, measuring 6.37 m in total length including its intact tentacles

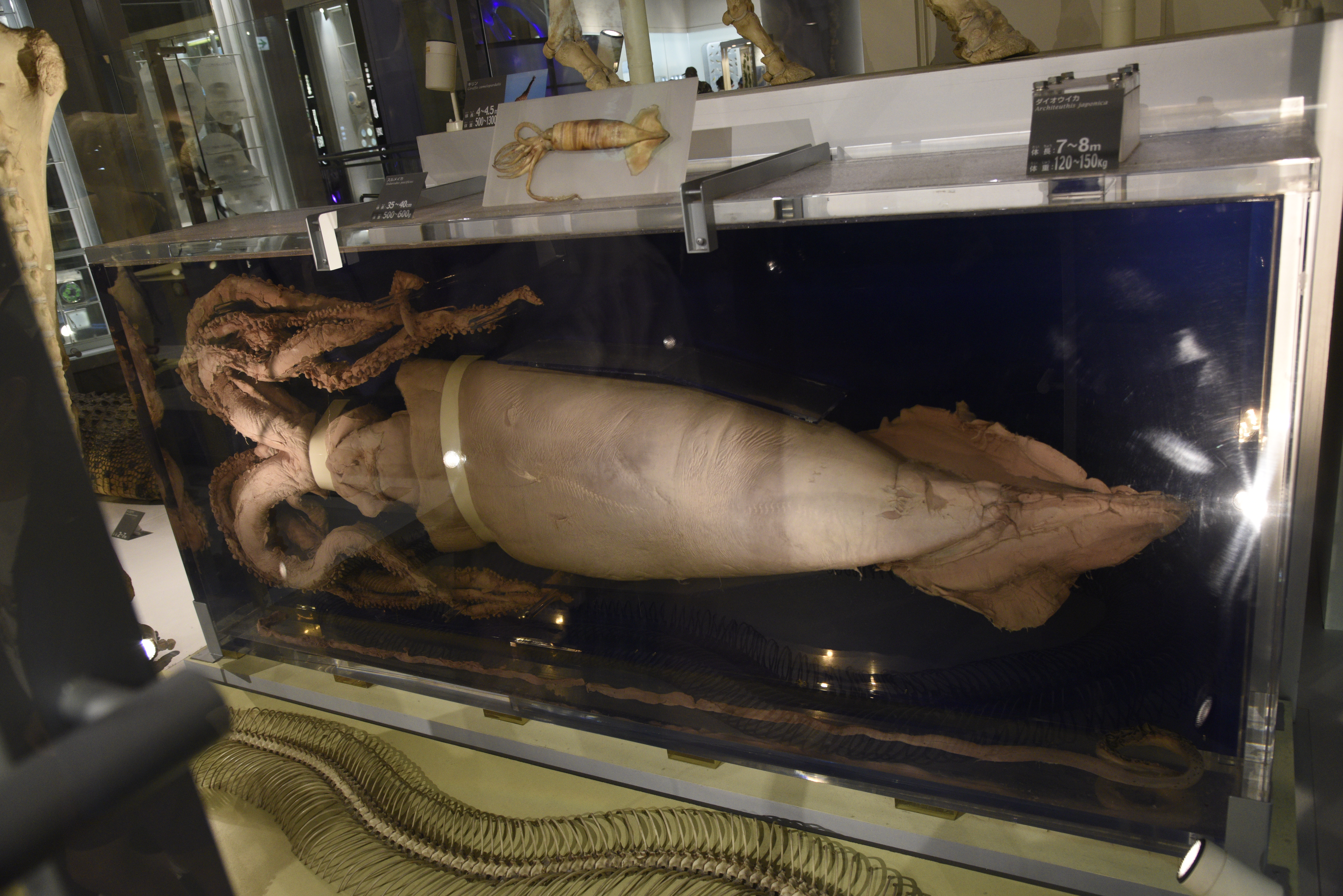
#379 (24/12/1996)
Specimen on display at the National Museum of Nature and Science in Tokyo, Japan, with a Japanese flying squid (Todarodes pacificus; top-centre) for size comparison (see also alternate view)

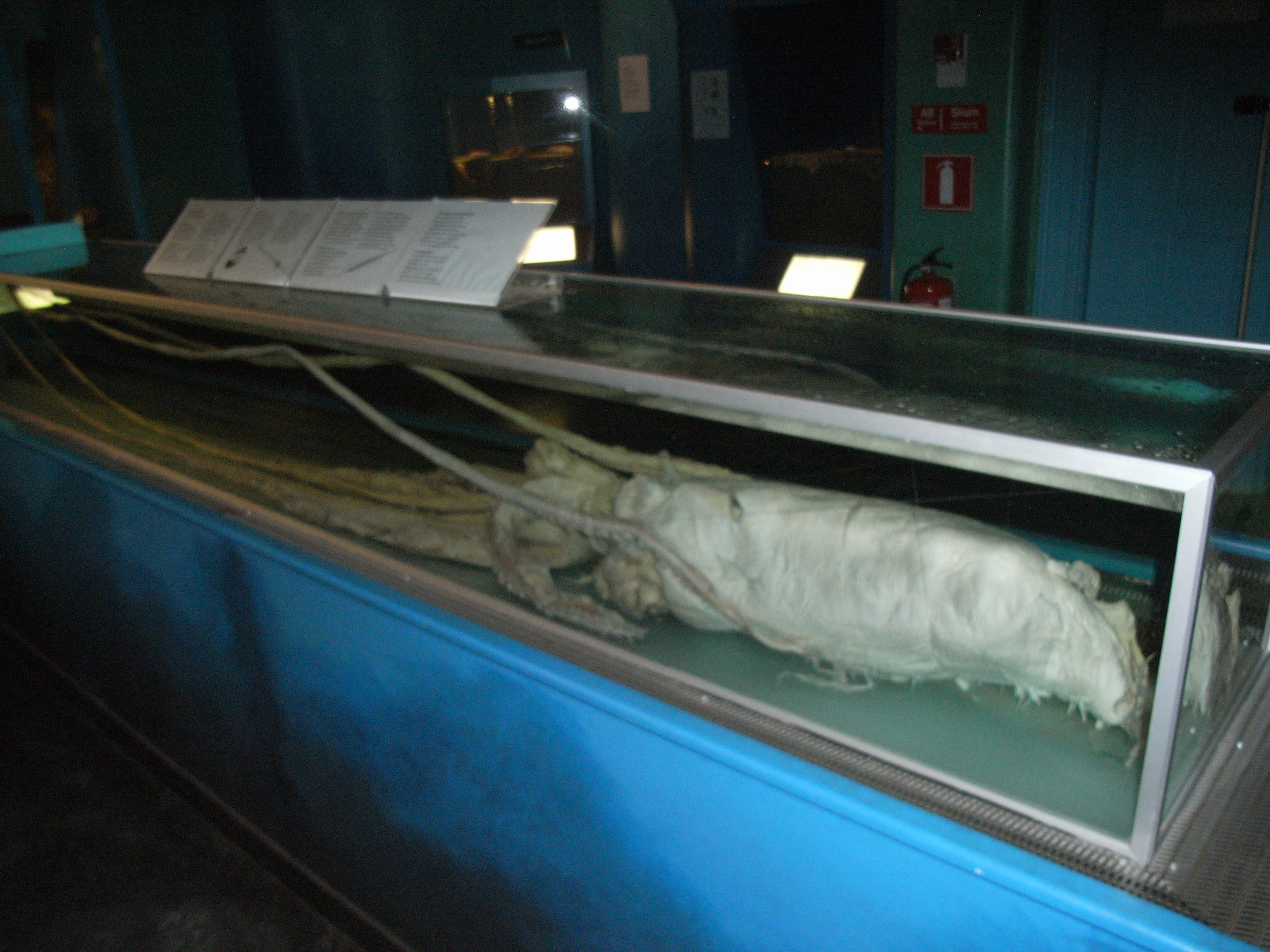
#381 (15/7/1997)
Specimen from the North Sea on display at the Swedish Museum of Natural History in Stockholm

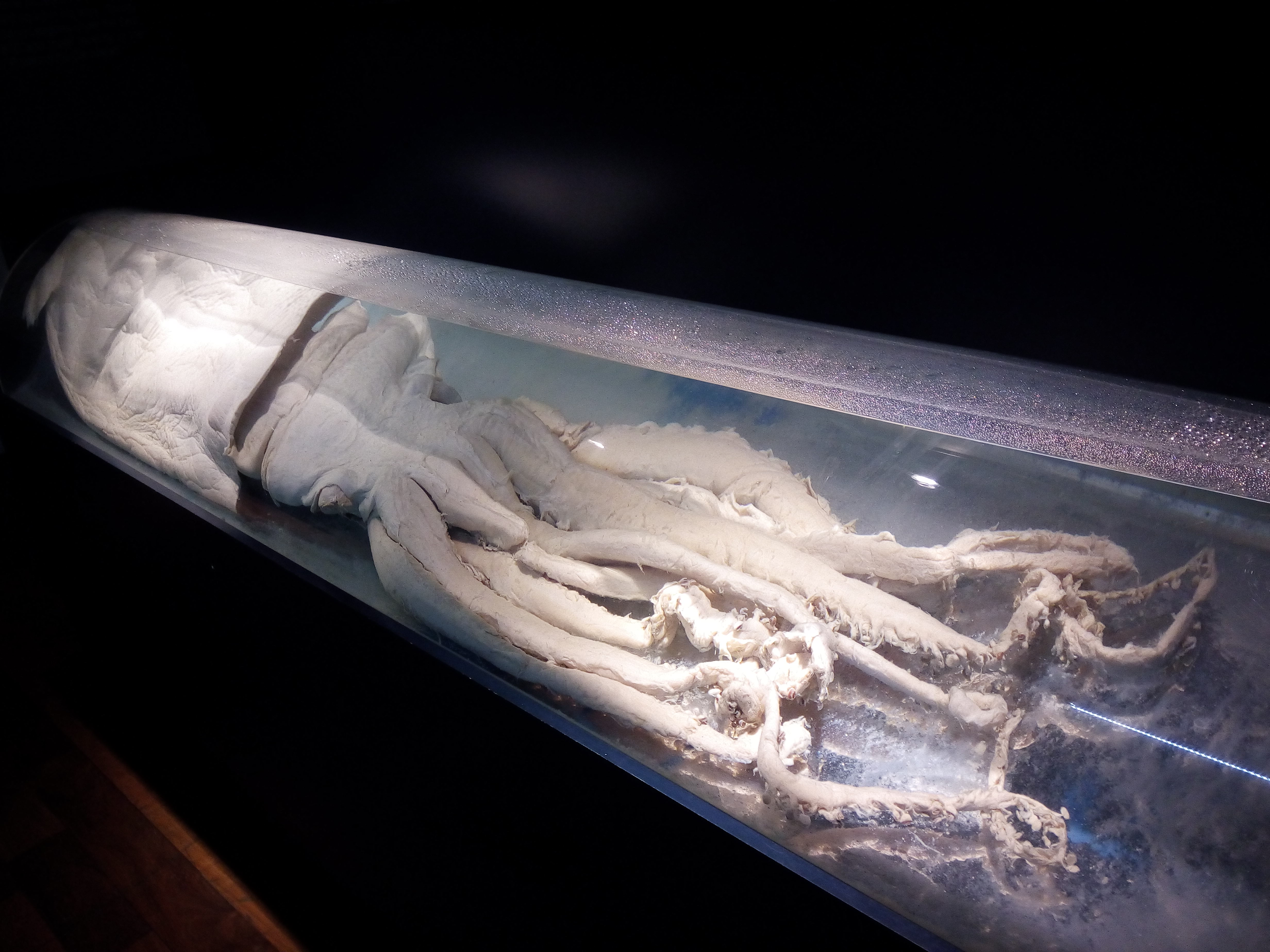
#383 (16/11/1997)
First known specimen from the Mediterranean Sea, on display at the Museo Alborania in Málaga, Spain. Preserved in formaldehyde, it is an immature female with a mantle length of around 1.25 m.

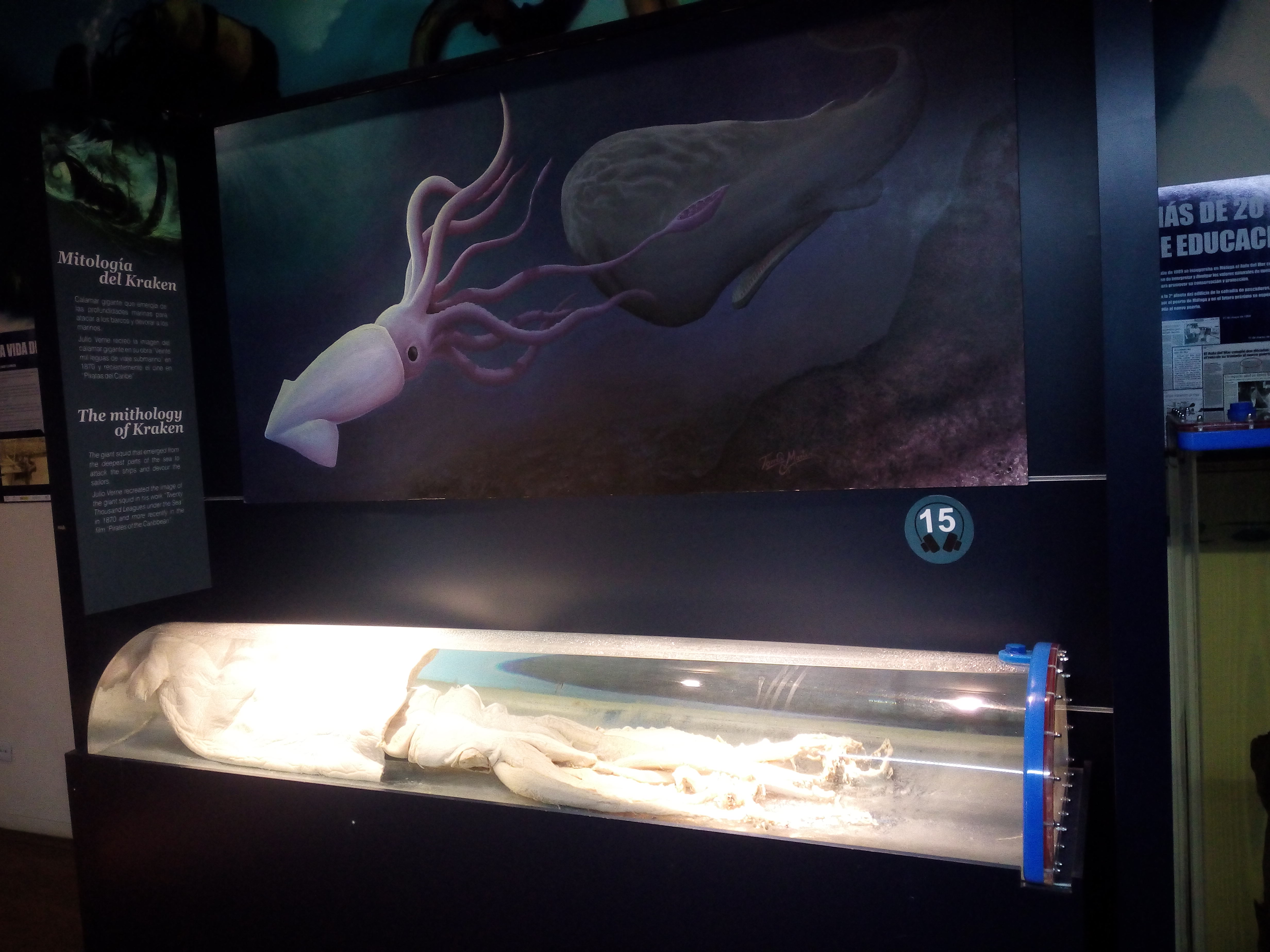
#383 (16/11/1997)
An overview of the entire giant squid exhibit at Museo Alborania, as it appeared in 2016 (see also closeups of head and arms)

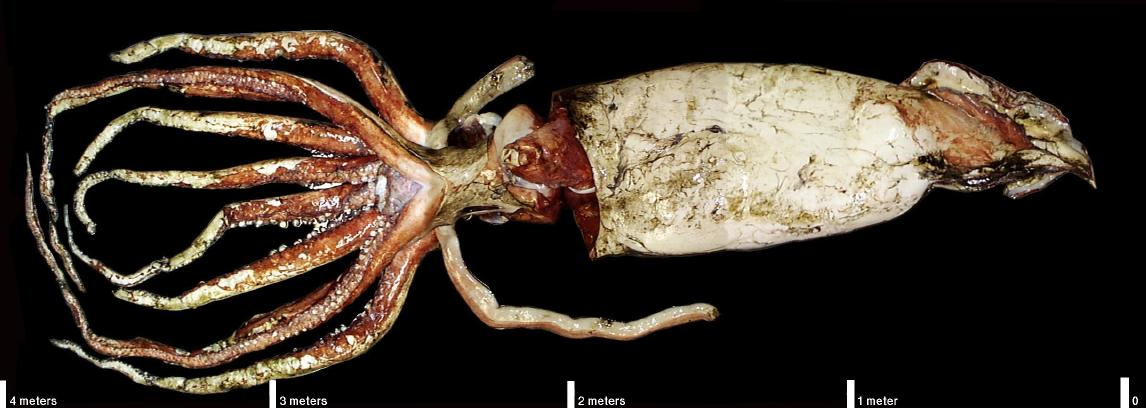
(?/?/1999)
Giant squid caught in early 1999 and dissected on 20–21 February of that year at the National Institute of Water and Atmospheric Research, Wellington, New Zealand, during "In Search of Giant Squid", the third and last of the Smithsonian-backed giant squid expeditions

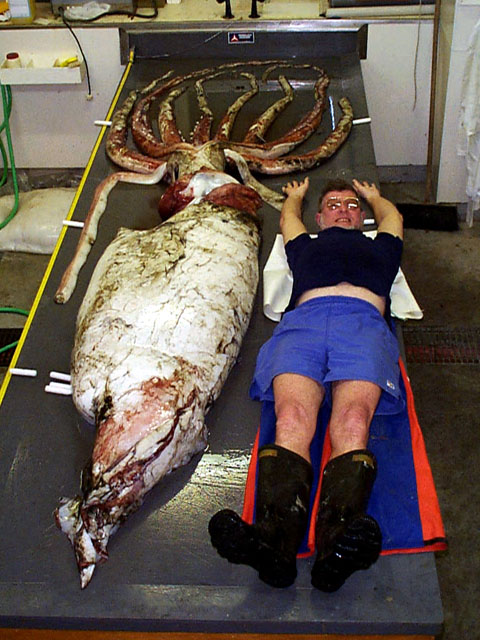
(?/?/1999)
Teuthologist Clyde Roper lying alongside the large specimen of almost 2 m (6.6 ft) mantle length

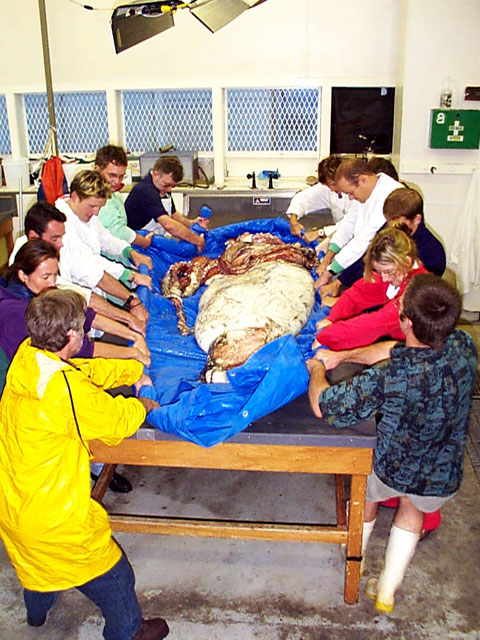
(?/?/1999)
A dozen people attempting to move the carcass, which weighed in excess of 200 kg (440 lb)

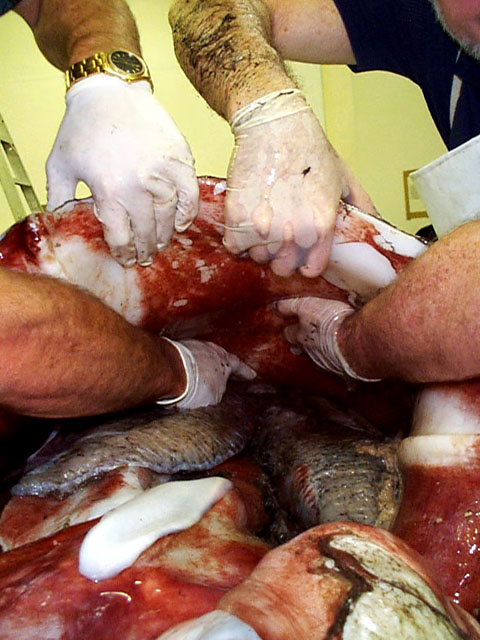
(?/?/1999)
A view into the specimen's mantle cavity. The paired, grey ctenidia (gills) are clearly visible.

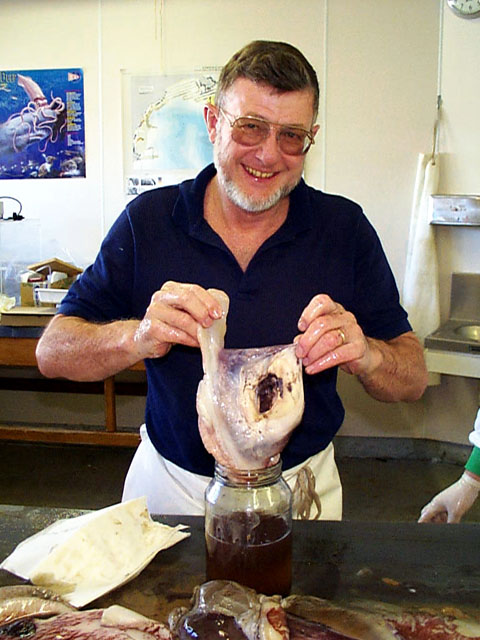
(?/?/1999)
Clyde Roper with one of the giant squid's enormous eyes

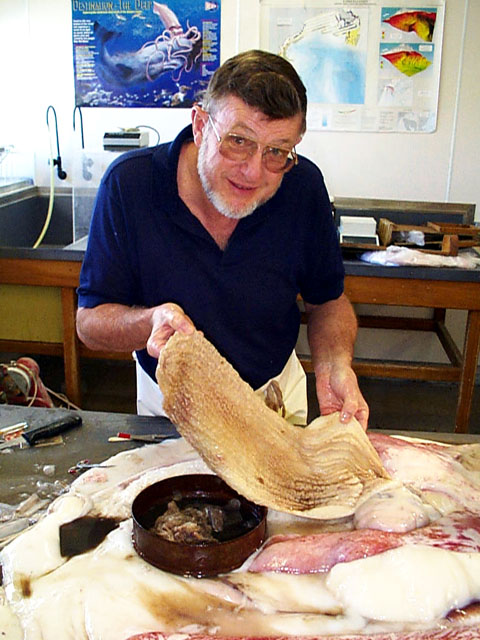
(?/?/1999)
Roper holding the giant squid's stomach

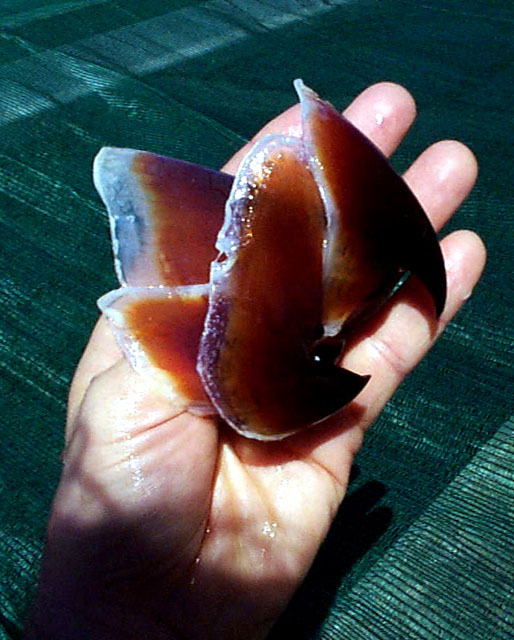
(?/?/1999)
The two-part beak following extraction from the surrounding musculature

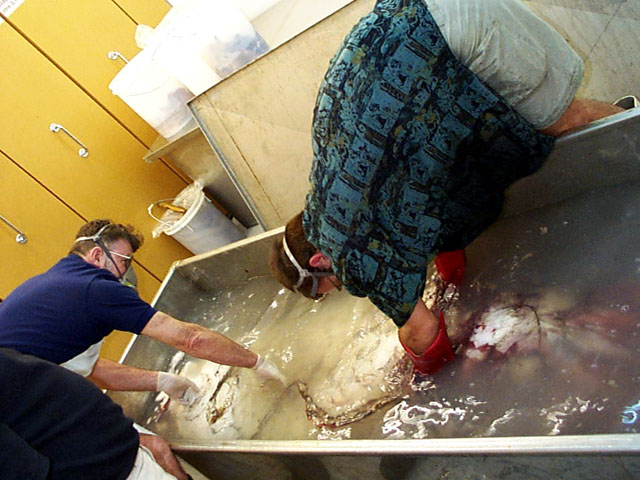
(?/?/1999)
Roper and Steve O'Shea positioning the specimen in a stainless steel tank filled with 10% formalin solution

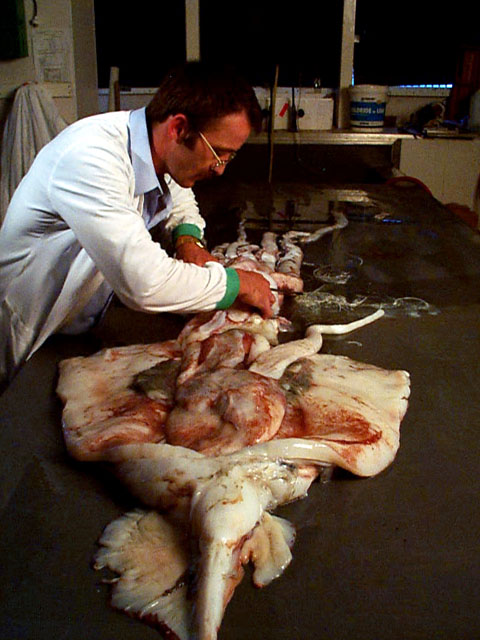
A small (1 m ML; 30 kg) but fully mature male being examined by Steve O'Shea on 28 February 1999, during the "In Search of Giant Squid" expedition

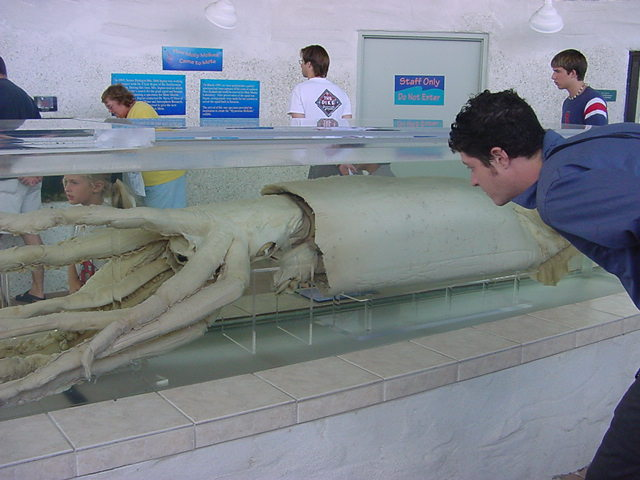
#407 (15/3/1999)
Giant squid nicknamed "Molly the Mollusk", preserved in a tank at Mote Aquarium in Sarasota, Florida

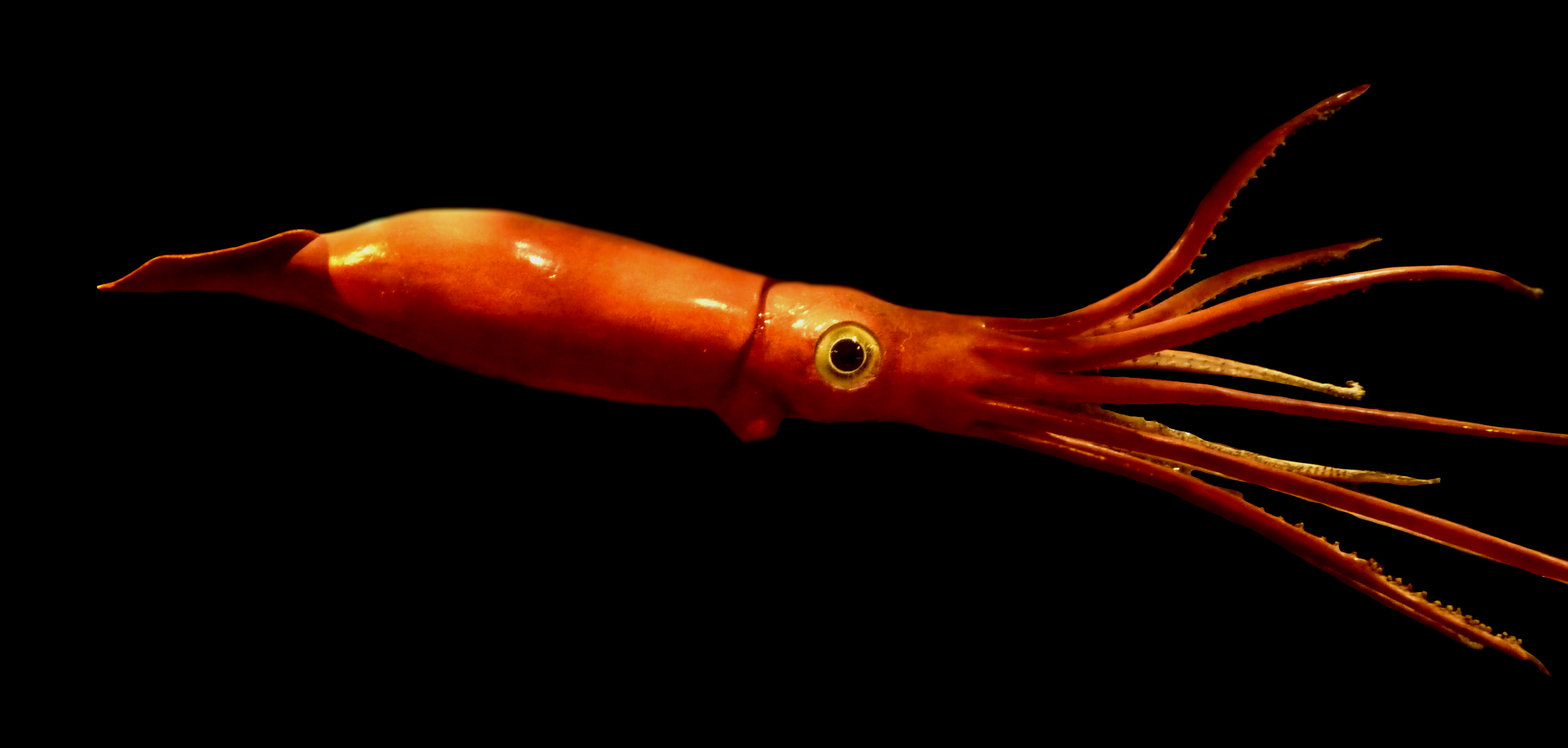
#429 (27/1/2000)
The world's first plastinated giant squid, nicknamed "Wheke", displayed at the Muséum national d'histoire naturelle in Paris, November 2009

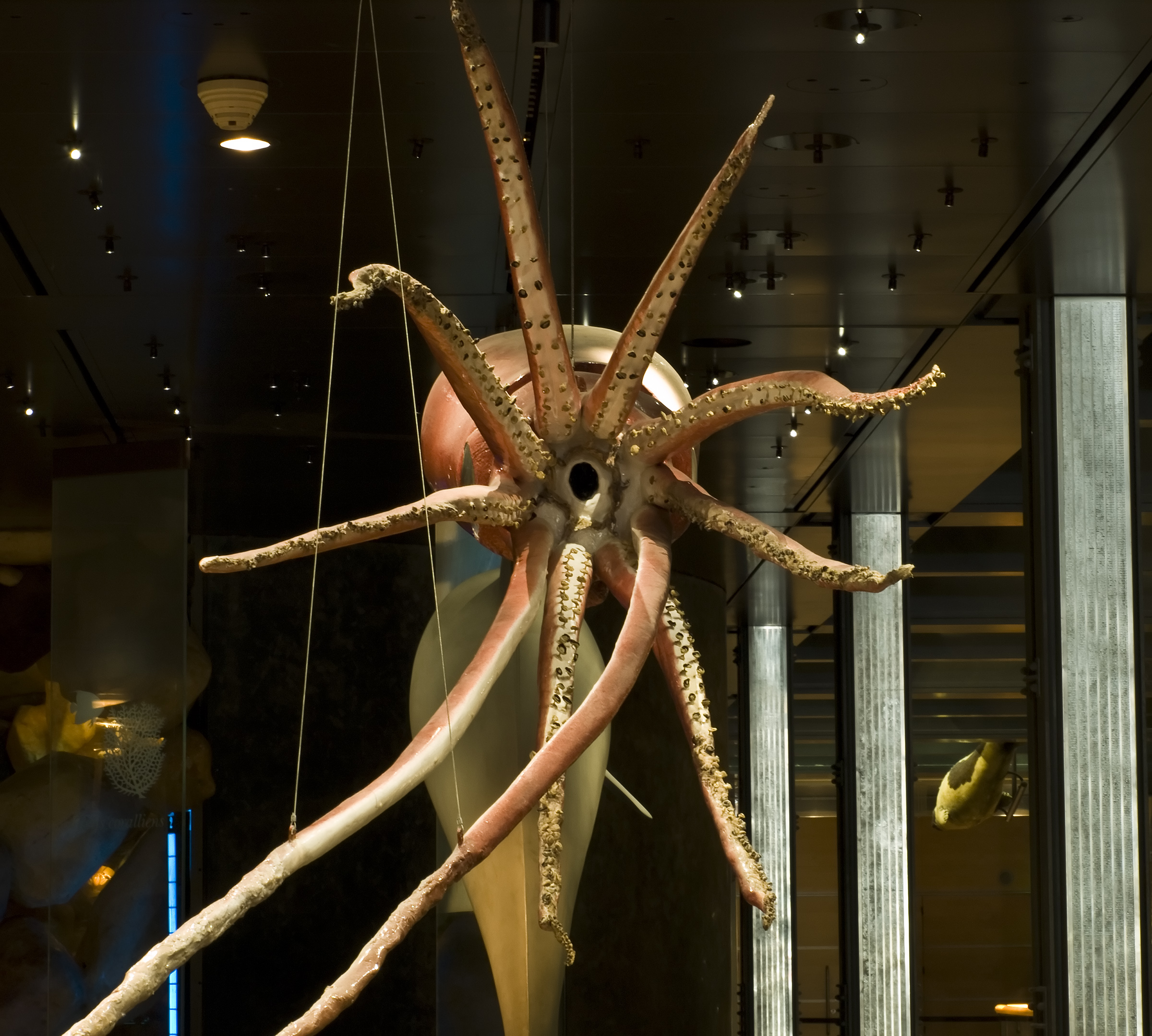
#429 (27/1/2000)
Oral view of the same specimen as it originally appeared, showing the brachial crown and beak, August 2008

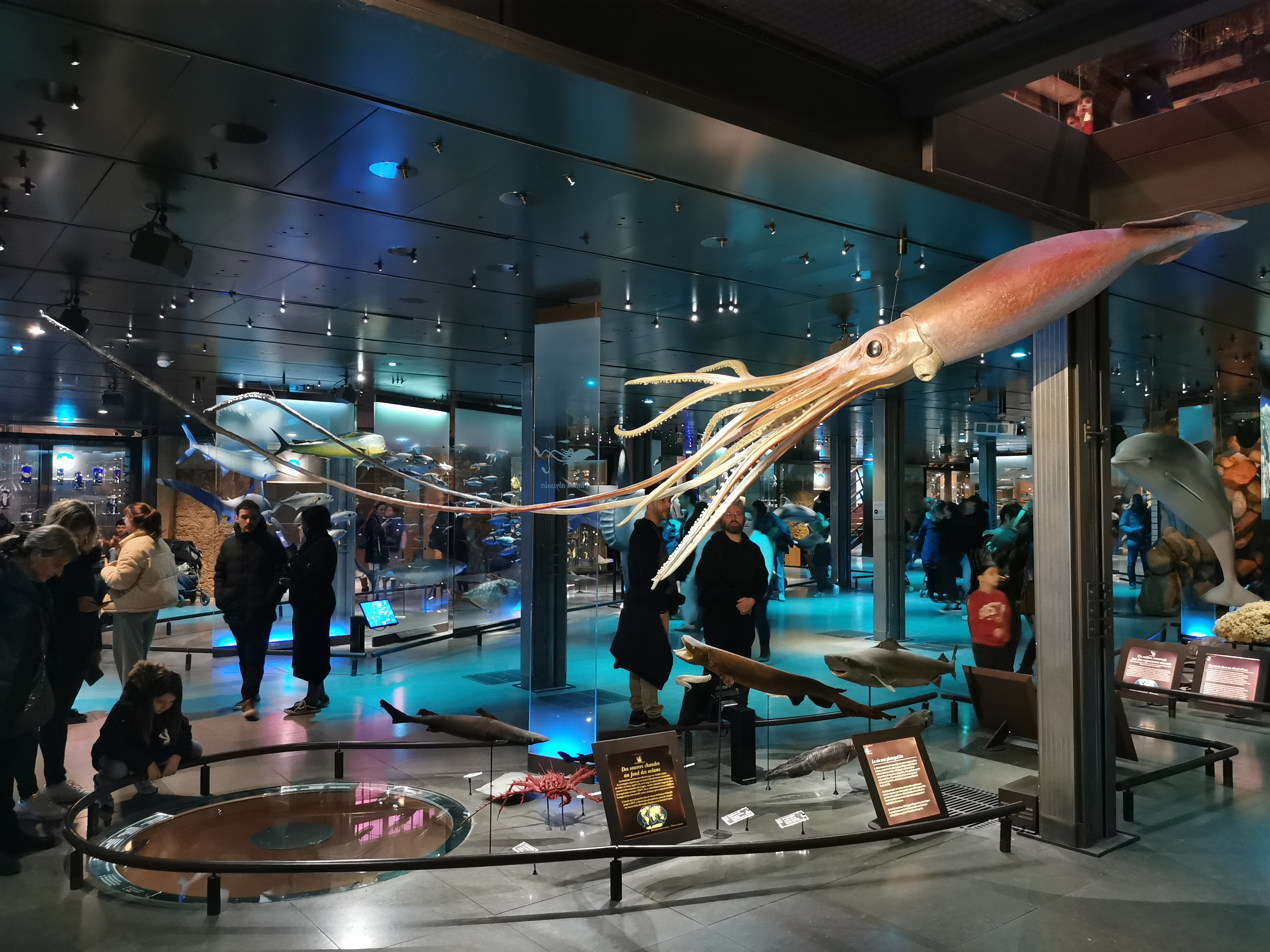
#429 (27/1/2000)
"Wheke" following its restoration in March 2019, which included a new paint application (see also alternate view, closeup, and other side)

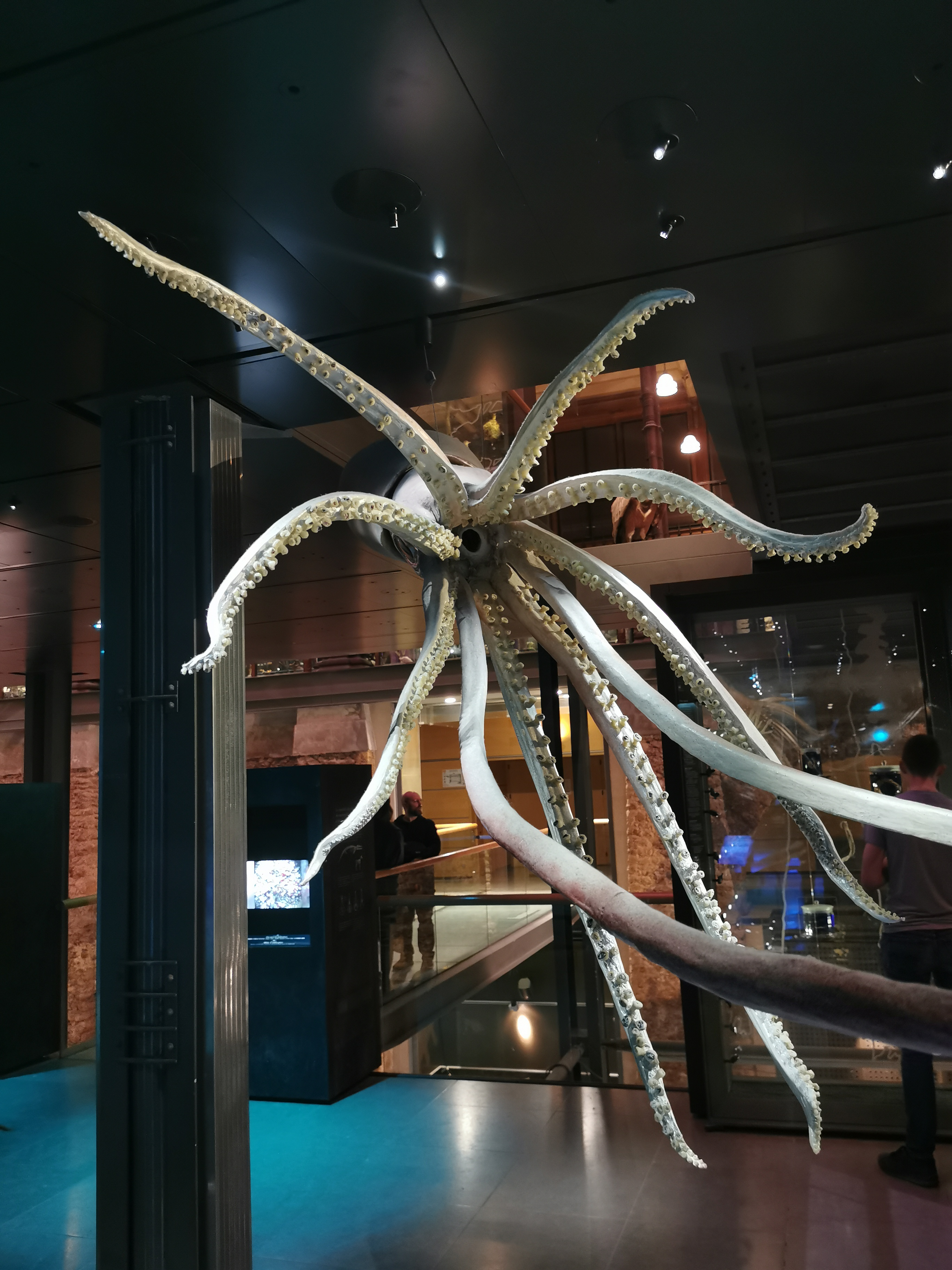
#429 (27/1/2000)
Oral view of "Wheke" in February 2023, following its restoration

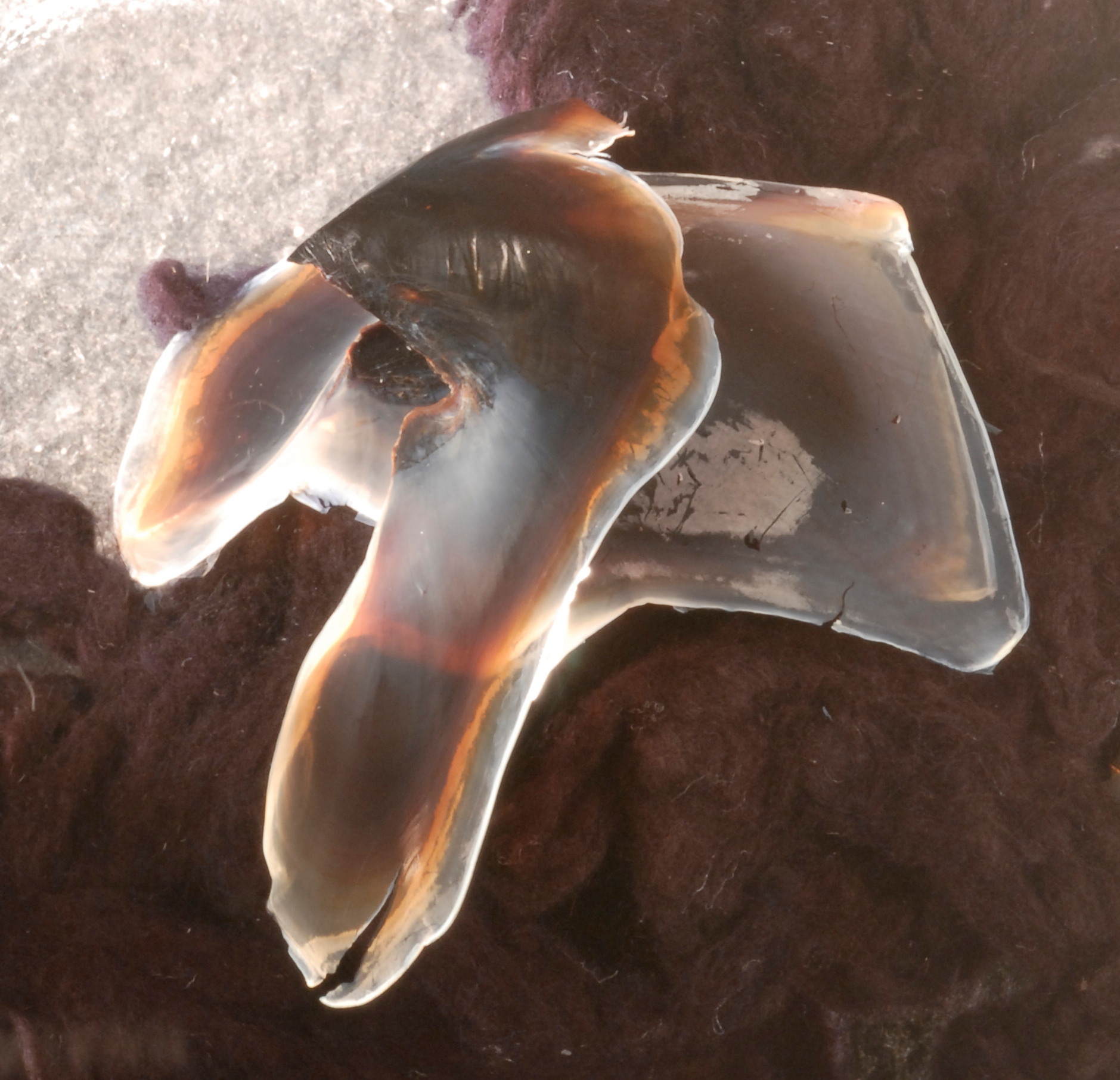
#437 (20/10/2000)
Lower beak of the giant squid found floating at the surface off Fort Lauderdale, Florida, on 20 October 2000

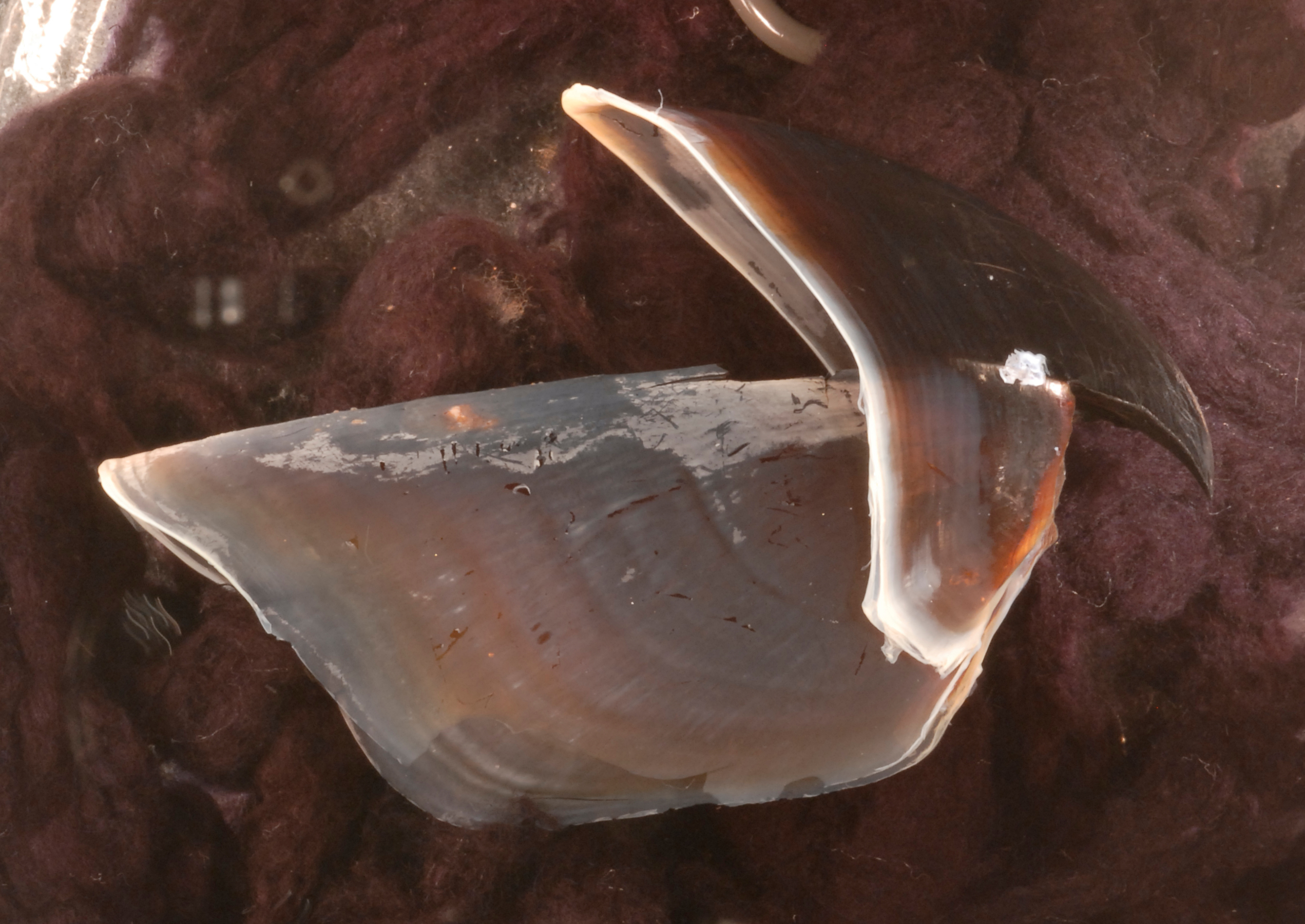
#437 (20/10/2000)
Upper beak of the same specimen

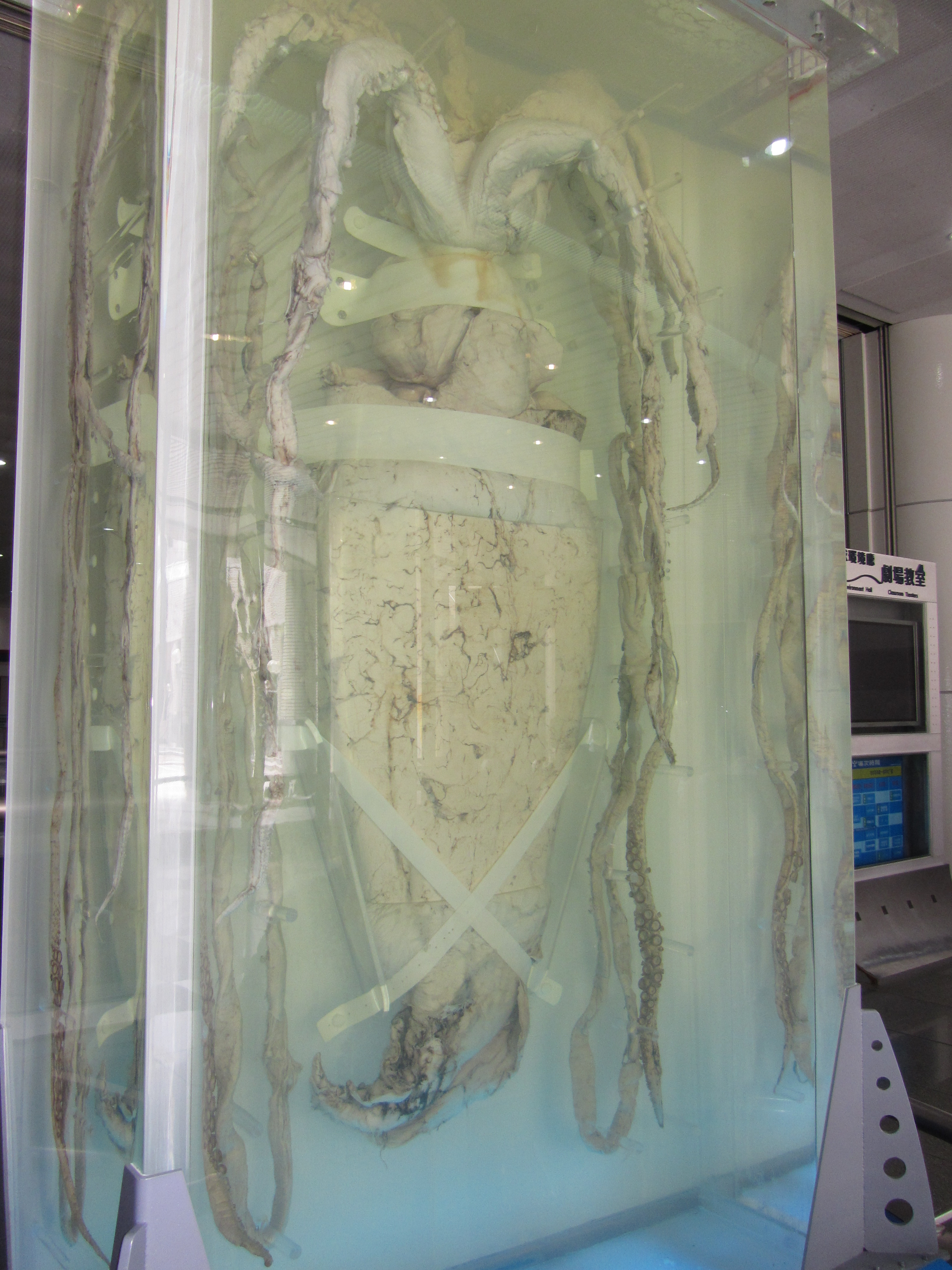
Specimen identified as Architeuthis sanctipauli exhibited on the first floor of the Global Environment Hall at the National Museum of Natural Science in Taichung, Taiwan. Measuring 8.84 m in total length and weighing 240 kg, it was captured in New Zealand waters and gifted by NIWA. It is said to be the world's largest specimen exhibited in a vertical position; the whole display including base, acrylic tank and formalin preservative weighs around 4 tonnes.

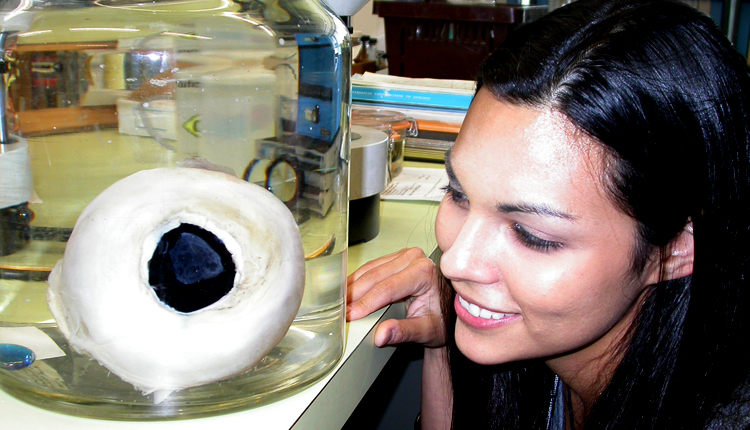
Preserved giant squid eye; together with that of the colossal squid it is the largest of any living animal

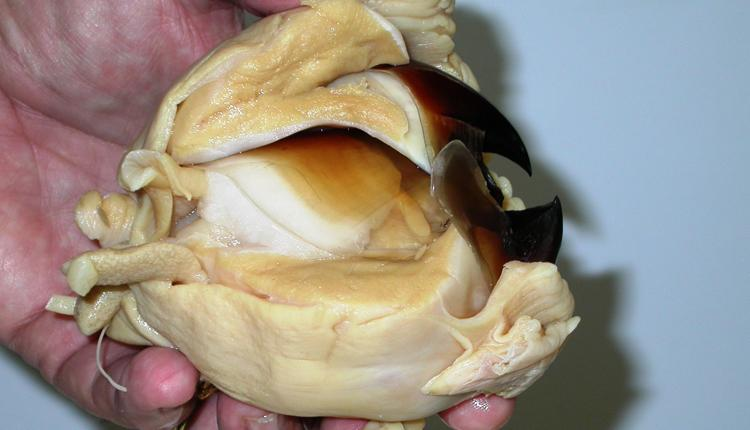
Giant squid beak with associated buccal musculature

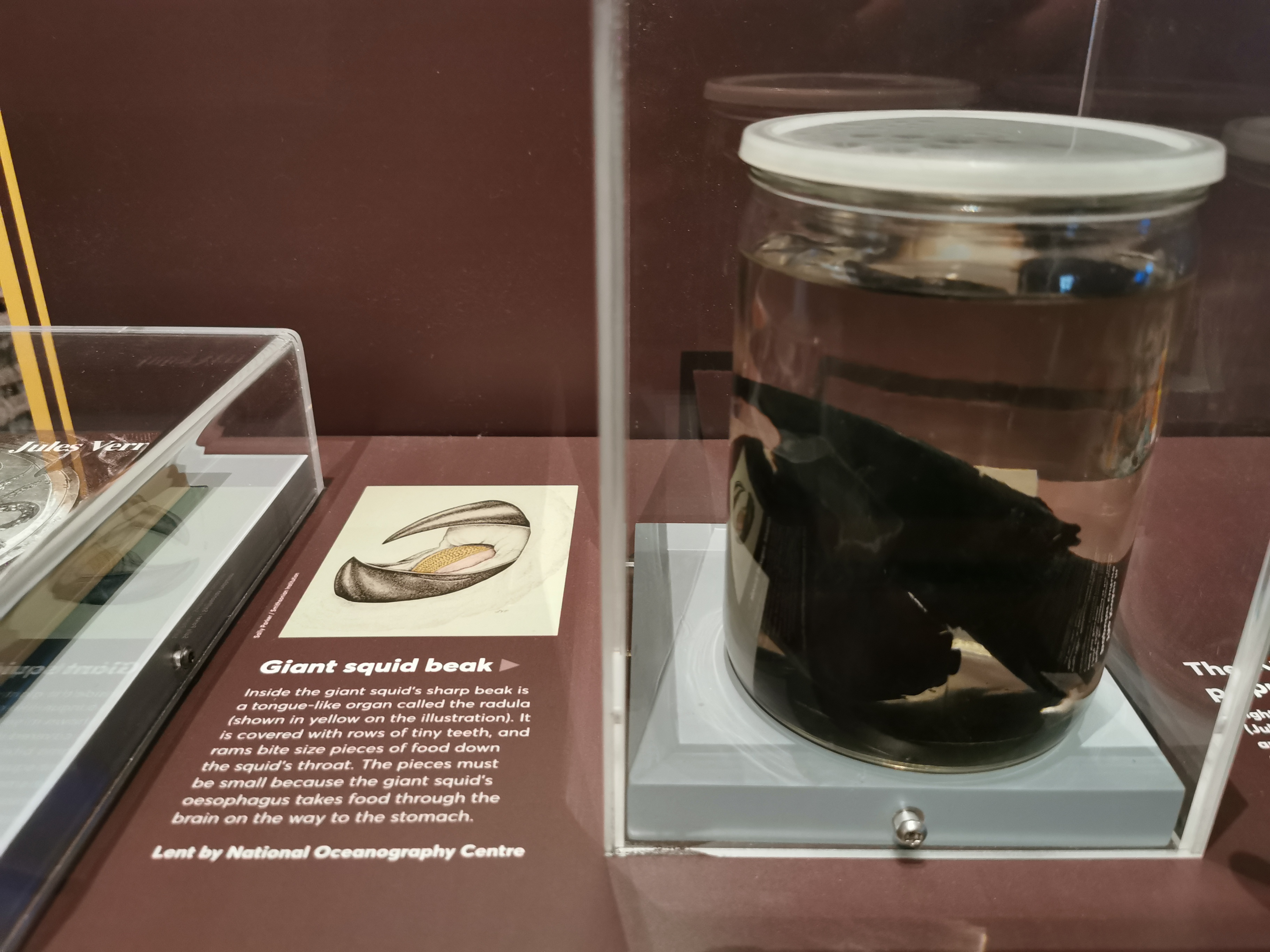
A "giant squid" beak recovered from a sperm whale stomach in Durban, part of the Discovery Collections displayed during the "Monsters of the Deep" exhibition (July 2020 – January 2023) at the National Maritime Museum Cornwall in Falmouth (see also label and wider exhibition)
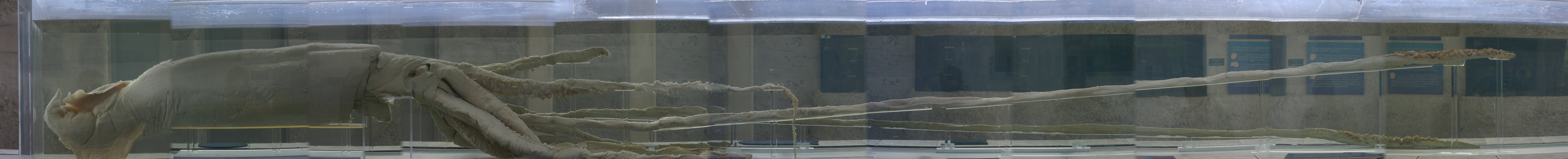
Originating from New Zealand, this giant squid specimen (#407) measures 27 feet (8.2 m) in total length and is preserved at Mote Aquarium in Sarasota, Florida. Nicknamed "Molly the Mollusk", it is one of only a handful of giant squid specimens on public display in the United States.
